= Ain't Your Mama =

Single by Jennifer Lopez
- Released: April 7, 2016
- Studio: Eightysevenfourteen Studios (Los Angeles, CA); The Vault (Los Angeles, CA)
- Genre: Pop
- Length: 3:38
- Label: Epic
- Songwriters: Theron Thomas; Lukasz "Dr. Luke" Gottwald; Gamal "Lunchmoney" Lewis; Henry "Cirkut" Walter; Meghan Trainor; Jacob Kasher Hindlin
- Producers: Cirkut; Dr. Luke

Jennifer Lopez singles chronology
"Try Me" (2015)	"Ain't Your Mama" (2016)	"Love Make the World Go Round" (2016)

Music video
- "Ain't Your Mama" on YouTube

"Ain't Your Mama" is a song recorded by American singer Jennifer Lopez. It was written by Meghan Trainor, Theron Thomas, Jacob Kasher Hindlin, Gamal "Lunchmoney" Lewis, Henry "Cirkut" Walter and Dr. Luke, while production was handled by the latter two. A pop song with influences of reggae, dancehall and Latin music, the song has percussion, drums, minimal synths and a Latin beat in its main instrumentation. Lyrically, "Ain't Your Mama" deals with themes of female empowerment, where the singer will not accept a partner who needs to be taken care of.

The song was released on April 7, 2016, by Epic Records. "Ain't Your Mama" became Lopez's first chart appearance in some European territories in over four years. Though it peaked within the top ten of record charts in a variety of countries, and received Diamond certifications in France and Poland, it stalled at 76 in the United States. The song's accompanying music video was directed by Cameron Duddy and released on May 6, 2016. It has Lopez playing women throughout the decades to show the second wave feminism movement.

== Background ==
In March 2016, six years following her departure from the label, it was announced that Lopez had returned to Epic Records and Sony Music Entertainment, signing a multi-album deal with the label. Lopez had released two albums under the Universal Music Group, Love? (2011) via Island Records and A.K.A. (2014) via Capitol Records. Lopez, who had been working on music in the midst of her Las Vegas residency, confirmed that she would be releasing new material: "I've been working on music for the past couple of months, and we should be putting something out very soon." "Ain't Your Mama" is the first single Lopez released since resigning with Epic, and was originally expected to precede her ninth studio album. Co-writer Meghan Trainor who texted Lopez the song said, "I sent it to her and said, 'Do you like the song?' and she said, 'I love the song, my kid loves the song — he's made me play it five times already so I know it's a hit. When can I cut it?', so I said immediately, 'Whenever you want!'" Lopez described the concept behind "Ain't Your Mama" as "very empowering", and explained: "Guys have this tendency, once they love you in the beginning and you're the hottest woman on Earth, and then all of a sudden, it's like, 'Okay... where's my food?' It's like, 'What!? Are you kidding me? Take me out! What are you doing right now?'"

== Composition ==
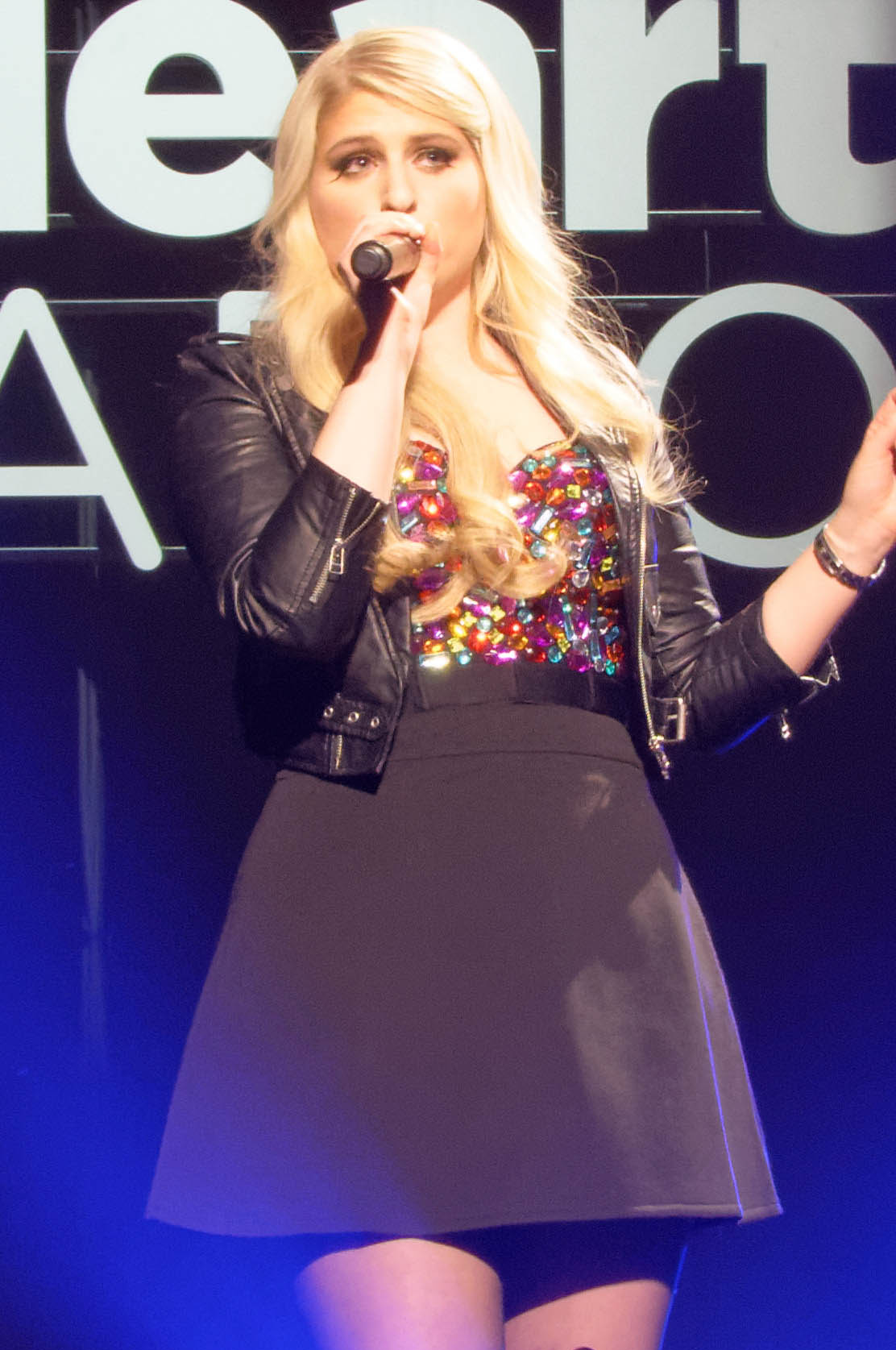
"Ain't Your Mama" was co-written by singer Meghan Trainor (pictured).

"Ain't Your Mama" is a pop song. It was written by Meghan Trainor, Theron Thomas, Jacob Kasher Hindlin, Gamal "Lunchmoney" Lewis, Henry Walter and Lukasz Gottwald. It was produced by Cirkut and Dr. Luke, with Trainor also providing background vocals. The song's production features percussion, drums, minimal synths and a "head-bobbing, hip-swaying" Latin beat, with a reggae groove. According to Forbes' Hugh McIntyre, "the track has a hint of Latin flare, which nobody does better, though it doesn't focus too much on any one sound, instead leaning much more towards typical top 40 fare." Sara Geffen of MTV News described it as "minimal but upbeat", stating that Lopez's voice takes "center stage". Lyrically, the song "celebrates a woman who is independent and won't accept a partner who needs to be taken care of", with Lopez "putting her man in his place for not pulling weight in their relationship". Rap-Up characterized the single as "sassy". It includes lyrics such as "I ain't gonna be cooking all day, I ain't your mama" and "I ain't gonna do your laundry, I ain't your mama... When did you get too comfortable, 'cause I'm too good for that". Entertainment Weekly called it an "anthem celebrating her independence and distaste in overly dependent partners".

== Release ==
Lopez announced "Ain't Your Mama" during a live video chat on Facebook while promoting the series finale of American Idol, where she played a short preview of the song. The video had already approximately 429,000 views online within the first 2 hours of release. She confirmed that it would be released digitally via iTunes on April 7, 2016. Lopez later posted the video on her Instagram account. Sasha Geffen from MTV News remarked, "Don't expect her to get domestic" and noted that "In what we're able to hear of the track so far, J.Lo totally rejects patriarchal gender roles". Writing for USA Today, Jaleesa M. Jones called the song "the perfect track for exasperated partners everywhere". The cover artwork for the single was unveiled on April 6. It features Lopez as a pin-up girl, dressed in "short shorts, stilettos and a white, fitted blouse". According to an Australian news site, the photo from the single's cover art was actually taken back in 2003, for an issue of Esquire.

=== Controversy ===
Within hours of the song's release, news outlets noted the fact that one of the song's producers was Dr. Luke. Many fans were outraged as the song had been released less than a few hours after it was announced that singer Kesha's lawsuit against Luke had been thrown out by the New York Supreme Court. Within hours, many Kesha supporters took to social media urging music buyers to boycott the song. The following day, E! News reported that the song itself was co-written by Luke and Meghan Trainor in 2014 prior to Kesha filing her lawsuit against Luke and was originally intended for Trainor's debut album Title, however Trainor ultimately decided not to use the song. Two years later after it was announced that Lopez had returned to Epic Records, the label that Trainor is also signed to, she recorded her own version of the song with Trainor providing background vocals after Trainor offered her the song. As Luke had already produced the song two years prior to Lopez recording her version, the two had no interaction during Lopez's recording of the song.

== Critical reception ==
Robbie Daw of Idolator called it "an instantly-catchy track" and an "independent-women anthem". Jessie Morris of Complex labelled it "an infectious anti-housewife anthem", observing that "the track's hot beat mixed with that searing hook makes 'Ain't Your Mama' a radio-ready hit." Brennan Carley of Spin named it "a light, tropical bit of froth with some impassioned lyrics and a killer drum bit," while Lewis Corner of Digital Spy referred to the song as a "hip-shaking anthem". Alexa Camp of Slant Magazine noted that "the song's subtle reggae groove recalls that of Lopez's slept-on 2011 single 'I'm Into You'," highlighting "its instantly memorable hook" and that it "finds the former Fly Girl flipping gender roles on their head, something she also did with the music video for 2014’s 'I Luh Ya Papi'."

== Chart performance ==
After a full tracking week, the song debuted at number 92 on the U.S. Billboard Hot 100, registering 1.8 million streams in the US. By June 16, 2016, "Ain't Your Mama" had sold 102,412 digital downloads in the US.

"Ain't Your Mama" reached number 5 in Germany, becoming one of the highest-peaking singles of Lopez's career and her first top ten hit since "On the Floor" (2011). The single has since been certified platinum by the Bundesverband Musikindustrie for exceeding 400,000 units. In Spain, the song debuted at number 51 for the week ending April 17, 2016. It peaked at number 5 nine weeks later, becoming her eleventh top ten hit as a lead artist (fourteenth overall), and spent a total of 15 weeks charting inside the top ten. "Ain't Your Mama" was later certified double platinum by Productores de Música de España. In France, the song debuted at number 108 and peaked at number 11 nineteen weeks later, making it her highest-peaking single in that country as a lead artist since "On the Floor". The song was later certified platinum by Syndicat National de l'Édition Phonographique. In Austria, the song also peaked at number 11, becoming her highest-peaking single as a lead artist since "Dance Again" (2012). It was later certified gold by IFPI Austria. In Switzerland, the song debuted at number 61 and peaked at number 16 fifteen weeks later, also becoming her highest-peaking single as a lead artist since "Dance Again".

== Music video ==
=== Production ===
The music video for "Ain't Your Mama" was directed by Cameron Duddy. Lopez previewed the music video on May 6, 2016, posting a "vintage-looking, sepia-toned" behind the scenes clip which features Lopez dressed as a 1950s housewife, sporting a "voluminous" Stepford Wives-esque hairstyle. It was released on May 6.

Various styles from different periods (ranging from the 1950s to present) appear in the video. Fashion houses such as Thierry Mugler were among the creators behind Lopez's wardrobe. The 1950s housewife character had a "classic" look, while also taking inspiration from pin-up models. The 1960s secretary look was inspired by the period drama series Mad Men. The 1970s factory worker had a "Norma Rae type feeling". The 1980s businesswoman took inspiration from the film Working Girl, a look which Lopez personally connected to, given she was a young girl during this decade. The last look was described by stylist Haenn as "just a modern day J. Lo". In this final dance sequence, Lopez can be seen wearing denim stiletto thigh-high boots designed by Barbadian singer Rihanna with Manolo Blahnik, which had been gifted to Lopez by Rihanna. It was reported that the music video's production was almost halted due to low funds, which resulted in a product placement specialist being hired two days before the shoot. Product placements in the video include Vogue magazine, Beluga vodka, and Lavazza coffee. The mobile social network application "Friendable" is also featured.

=== Synopsis ===
A 1950s housewife is among the multiple different characters Lopez plays in the music video for "Ain't Your Mama".

In the clip, Lopez plays a number of archetypal characters, including: a news anchor who urges women to "rise up against their male oppressors", a 1950s housewife, a 1960s secretary, an underpaid factory worker in the 1970s (her hotheaded boss played by actor Eric Womack), and a 1980s businesswoman. It opens with the news anchor Lopez having a heated conversation in a phone booth, stating: "I'm tired, I've been working all day! No, I can't...you should [do it]". She then appears in a television news studio, where part of Hillary Clinton's famous 1995 "Women's Rights Are Human Rights" speech, followed by part of Patricia Arquette's Academy Award speech (specifically Arquette saying, "It's our time to have wage equality once and for all, and equal rights for women in the United States of America"), followed by part of Gloria Steinem's famous 1971 "Address to the Women of America" speech, can be heard in the background. Lopez disregards the script and begins speaking: "Look, I don't have to tell you things are bad. Everybody knows things are bad. Taken for granted, ignored, overlooked, under-appreciated."

The other characters watch news anchor Lopez through the television as she states, "I'm mad as hell and I'm not going to take it anymore!", which is a reference to a line spoken by character Howard Beale from the satirical film Network (1976). As a result of the news anchor's speech, all of the women begin rebelling against the males who have been exploiting them. The blonde 1950s housewife stops tending to her husband, sings "I ain't gon' be cookin' all day. I ain't your mama", then dumps food over his head. The redheaded 1960s secretary throws vodka back in her boss's face. It ends with an all-women march in Brooklyn, New York. Lopez wears a white jumpsuit for a final dance scene.

=== Reception ===
The music video received praise from presidential nominee Hillary Clinton, whose speech is among those sampled in it.

After its first three days, the music video had garnered over 11 million views. Sasha Geffen of MTV News called the visual "politically charged". Leila Cobo of Billboard praised the video as "vastly entertaining", observing that it depicts the "history of women's fight for independence", with various pop culture and social references. Complex magazine writer Suzannah Weiss commended its "powerful plot line", noting: "It's an anthem for women dealing with man-children everywhere, and the music video ties it into larger issues of sexism contributing to these relationships." Of the video, Dave Quinn of People said, "she's not mincing words when it comes to the song's feminist message", while Richy Rosario of Vibe wrote: "Like many other women who have showcased their plight in gender inequality through art, Ms. Lopez is definitely making a statement."

Sabienna Bowman of Bustle magazine commended the music video, "Each frame in the video is loaded with historical imagery that takes you from the beginning of the second wave feminism movement straight through to today." Further underlining its context, Bowman noted that "The historical context behind the video is beautifully rendered and full of pop culture nods to famous films, as well as the very real history of the women whose lives were changed by the impact of second wave feminism." Conversely, Christina Cauterucci for Slate magazine reacted negatively, labeling the video a "sad premonition of the future of feminism" and saying that it serves as "a helpful illustration of an ascendant brand of feminism that boasts more marketable style than political substance". 2016 presidential candidate Hillary Clinton, whose speech was sampled in the opening sequence, thanked Lopez for the music video, responding: "Women are so much more than the roles they've been assigned." It is Lopez's second most-watched music video, with more than 900 million views on YouTube as of August 2024.

== Live performances ==
Lopez premiered "Ain't Your Mama" on the series finale of American Idol on April 7, 2016. Speaking of the performance beforehand, she stated: "It's going to be very high energy". Lopez wore a "sparkly" French maid costume while singing "Ain't Your Mama", surrounded by several backup dancers. She followed it with a performance of her hit "Let's Get Loud", undergoing a quick costume change. The following month, she performed the song during a private concert at the Hammerstein Ballroom which was hosted by Telemundo. Lopez also added the song to the setlist of her Las Vegas Residency, All I Have. She later performed the song as part of her medley during the 2018 MTV Video Music Awards on August 20, 2018, at Radio City Music Hall in New York City. On May 2, 2021, Lopez headlined Global Citizen's VAX Live: The Concert to Reunite the World, a campaign aimed at promoting the COVID-19 vaccine, where she closed the show with "Ain't Your Mama". The performance featured 52 dancers and included an interpolation of Saweetie's "Pretty Bitch Freestyle".

== Track listing ==
Digital download/streaming

1. "Ain't Your Mama" – 3:38

CD single

1. "Ain't Your Mama" – 3:38
2. "Ain't Your Mama" (instrumental) – 3:32

== Credits and personnel ==
Credits adapted from Tidal.

- Chris Gehringer - mastering engineer
- Serban Ghenea – mixing engineer
- Clint Gibbs - engineer
- Lukasz "Dr. Luke" Gottwald – songwriter, producer, background vocals, programming
- John Hanes – mixing engineer
- Jacob Kasher Hindlin – songwriter
- Gamal "Lunchmoney" Lewis – songwriter, background vocals
- Jennifer Lopez – lead vocals
- Trevor Muzzy - engineer
- Tyler Sheppard - assistant Engineer
- Meghan Trainor – songwriter, background vocals
- Theron Thomas – songwriter
- Kalani Thompson - assistant engineer
- Henry "Cirkut" Walter – songwriter, producer, background vocals, programming

== Charts ==
=== Weekly charts ===
Chart (2016–17)	Peak position
Argentina (Monitor Latino)	7
Australia (ARIA)	85
Austria (Ö3 Austria Top 40)	11
Belgium (Ultratip Bubbling Under Flanders)	19
Belgium (Ultratop 50 Wallonia)	27
Bulgaria (ARC Top 40)	27
Canada Hot 100 (Billboard)	34
Czech Republic Airplay (ČNS IFPI)	1
Czech Republic Singles Digital (ČNS IFPI)	39
Denmark (Tracklisten)	36
Euro Digital Songs (Billboard)	20
Finland Download (Latauslista)	6
France (SNEP)	11
Germany (GfK)	5
Greece Digital Songs (Billboard)	3
Hungary (Dance Top 40)	5
Hungary (Rádiós Top 40)	5
Hungary (Single Top 40)	6
Israel International Airplay (Media Forest)	5
Italy (FIMI)	32
Lebanon (The Official Lebanese Top 20)	4
Luxembourg Digital Songs (Billboard)	5
Netherlands (Dutch Top 40 Tipparade)	9
Netherlands (Global Top 40)	36
Netherlands (Single Top 100)	63
Poland Airplay (ZPAV)	3
Poland Dance (ZPAV)	36
Poland (Video Chart)	4
Portugal (AFP)	29
Russia Airplay (Tophit)	120
Scottish Singles Sales (Official Charts)	69
Slovakia Airplay (ČNS IFPI)	3
Slovakia Singles Digital (ČNS IFPI)	20
Slovenia (SloTop50)	16
South Korea (Gaon Chart)	97
Spain (PROMUSICAE)	5
Switzerland (Schweizer Hitparade)	16
Switzerland (Media Control Romandy)	4
UK Singles (Official Charts)	182
US Billboard Hot 100	76
US Dance Club Songs (Billboard)	44
Venezuela English (Record Report)	8
Venezuela Pop (Record Report)	5

=== Year-end charts ===
Chart (2016)	Position
Austria (Ö3 Austria Top 40)	48
Belgium (Ultratop Wallonia)	88
Chile (Monitor Latino)	49
Denmark (Tracklisten)	99
France (SNEP)	38
Germany (Official German Charts)	20
Hungary (Dance Top 40)	16
Hungary (Rádiós Top 40)	17
Hungary (Single Top 40)	16
Israel (Media Forest)	50
Italy (FIMI)	90
Poland (ZPAV)	21
Spain (PROMUSICAE)	15
Switzerland (Schweizer Hitparade)	45

Chart (2017)	Position
France (SNEP)	181
Hungary (Rádiós Top 40)	35

== Certifications ==
Region	Certification	Certified units/sales
Australia (ARIA)	Platinum	70,000^{‡}
Austria (IFPI Austria)	Gold	15,000^{‡}
Denmark (IFPI Danmark)	Platinum	90,000^{^}
France (SNEP)	Diamond	233,333^{‡}
Germany (BVMI)	Platinum	400,000^{‡}
Italy (FIMI)	2× Platinum	100,000^{‡}
Mexico (AMPROFON)	Platinum	60,000^{‡}
New Zealand (RMNZ)	Gold	15,000^{‡}
Poland (ZPAV)	Diamond	100,000^{‡}
Portugal (AFP)	Platinum	10,000^{‡}
Spain (Promusicae)	3× Platinum	120,000^{‡}
United Kingdom (BPI)	Silver	200,000^{‡}
United States (RIAA)	Gold	500,000^{‡}
^{^} Shipments figures based on certification alone.^{‡} Sales+streaming figures based on certification alone.

== Release history ==
Country	Date	Format	Label	Ref.
France	April 7, 2016	Digital download	RCA	
Germany	April 7, 2016	Digital download	Sony	
Italy	April 7, 2016	Digital download	Sony	
Spain	April 7, 2016	Digital download	Sony	
United Kingdom	April 7, 2016	Digital download	RCA	
United States	April 7, 2016	Digital download	Epic; Sony	
United States	April 12, 2016	Contemporary hit radio	Epic; Sony	
United States	April 12, 2016	Rhythmic contemporary	Epic; Sony	
United States	May 10, 2016	Contemporary hit radio (re-release)	Epic; Sony	
Italy	May 13, 2016	Contemporary hit radio	Sony	
Germany	August 12, 2016	CD single	Sony	
