= It's My Party (tour) =

2019 concert tour by Jennifer Lopez

- Tour by Jennifer Lopez
- Location: Africa; Asia; Europe; North America
- Start date: June 7, 2019
- End date: August 11, 2019
- Legs: 2
- No. of shows: 37
- Supporting acts: Briar Nolet; The Lab; Swing Latino
- Attendance: 505,380 (Note: The gross and attendance is based on 30 shows.)
- Box office: $68.3 million

Jennifer Lopez concert chronology
- Jennifer Lopez: All I Have (2016–2018); It's My Party (2019); Up All Night: Live in 2025 (2025)

It's My Party was the fourth concert tour by American entertainer Jennifer Lopez. The tour was announced during her appearance on The Ellen DeGeneres Show on February 13, 2019. The North American leg of the tour began on June 7, 2019, in Inglewood, California and ended on July 27, 2019, in Miami, after performing 32 shows in Canada and the United States. Lopez then performed six international shows, starting in Tel Aviv on August 1, 2019, and ending in Saint Petersburg on August 11, 2019.

== Planning, itinerary and ticketing ==
In December 2018, while promoting her film Second Act, Lopez announced plans to tour the United States during the summer of 2019. The tour was officially announced by the entertainer during her appearance on The Ellen DeGeneres Show on February 13, 2019. She revealed that she would be doing "a small amount of shows" throughout June and July to celebrate her 50th birthday on July 24, 2019. The dates for the 24-city North American tour, titled It's My Party: The Live Celebration, were announced shortly after her appearance on the show. The tour was scheduled to start on June 7, 2019, at the Talking Stick Resort Arena in Phoenix and end on July 26, 2019, at the American Airlines Arena in Miami. Shortly after the tour's announcement, several third-party websites began selling fake tickets to the show. Marketing specialist Shalimar Madrigal acknowledged that he was aware of these websites on February 14, 2019, and warned buyers to be careful and to only purchase tickets from official websites. Ticketmaster issued a statement on their official Twitter account on February 20, 2019, stating that "we see tickets for @JLo's #ItsMyPartyTour on other websites, but no tickets have been sold yet". On February 27, 2019, several dates were rescheduled and additional shows were added in select cities, with the tour now beginning on June 7, 2019, at The Forum in Inglewood, California. The show at the Coliseo de Puerto Rico Jose Miguel Agrelot in San Juan planned for June 28, 2019, was cancelled on March 18, 2019; a reason for the cancellation was not specified.

On March 22, 2019, the tour was re-announced as the It's My Party tour; a 25-city North American tour that begins at The Forum in Inglewood, California on June 7, 2019, and ends at the American Airlines Arena in Miami on July 25, 2019. A pre-sale for American Express cardholders began on March 26, 2019, while tickets went on sale to the general public starting on March 29, 2019. Four additional concerts were announced on March 27, 2019, bringing the total up to 29 shows. On April 5, 2019, it was reported that Lopez would be bringing the tour to Israel, which would be her first concert in the country. Israeli media had previously reported that she would be performing in Tel Aviv in 2012 and 2016, but neither one of these shows materialized. According to The Jerusalem Post, "the concert rumors were met with online campaigns by the BDS movement calling on Lopez to cancel". The concert was officially confirmed on April 17, 2019 and announced to take place on August 1, 2019. Concert prompter Mario Arlowski claimed that Lopez "had not faced any pressure from boycott activists" for the concert, which went on sale later that same day. The show was also revealed to be the first of six international concerts that Lopez would be playing during the It's My Party tour.

On April 22, 2019, it was announced that she would be performing in Moscow on August 4, 2019; tickets for the show went on sale the same day. A second show in Chicago and a third show in Miami was announced on April 29, 2019. Tickets for these two shows went on sale on May 3, 2019. Several days later, it was revealed that Lopez would be bringing the tour to the North Coast of Egypt, although the exact location and venue could not be confirmed at the time. It was announced on May 13, 2018, that Lopez would be performing in Turkey on August 6, 2019, as part of the Regnum Carya Live in Concert series. After a series of conflicting reports, the show in Egypt was officially announced on May 24, 2019, to take place on August 9, 2019, at the Seacode beach club in El Alamein. Tickets for the show were on sale before the city and venue were confirmed. On July 12, 2019, it was announced that Lopez would be performing in Spain on August 8, 2019.

=== Merchandise ===
On May 30, 2019, it was announced that Guess would serve as the official merchandise partner for the It's My Party tour. The company had previously collaborated with Lopez during their spring 2018 campaign. Dubbed as GUESS x Jennifer Lopez "It's My Party" Tour, the collection consists of a variety of concert T-shirts and a denim jacket that features a "colorful J.Lo pop art graphic on the back". Select pieces of the collection will be available at select Guess locations in the United States and Canada, as well as on the company's website, starting on June 7, 2019. The full collection will be available for sale at each show during the duration of the tour.

== Commercial performance ==
According to The Times of Israel, Lopez's concert at Yarkon Park in Tel Aviv on August 1, 2019 drew an audience of around 57,000.

== Awards and nominations ==
Year	Awards	Category	Result	Ref.
2019	Latin American Music Awards	Favorite Tour	Nominated	
2019	People's Choice Awards	The Concert Tour of 2019	Nominated	
2019	Pollstar Awards	Best Latin Tour	Won	
2020	Billboard Latin Music Awards	Tour of the Year	Won	

== Set list ==
This set list is representative of the show on June 7, 2019, in Inglewood, California. It may not represent every show.

1. "Medicine" (With elements from "Entrance of the Glatiators" by Julius Fučík, "In da Club" by 50 Cent and "Tipsy" by J-Kwon)
2. "Love Don't Cost a Thing" (With elements from the "RJ Schoolyard Mix" and "In My Feelings" by Drake)
3. "Get Right"
4. "Dinero" (With elements from "Bodak Yellow" by Cardi B and "Bitch Better Have My Money" by Rihanna)
5. "I'm Real" (Murder Remix)
6. "Ain't It Funny" (Murder Remix)
7. "Jenny from the Block" (With elements from "Started from the Bottom" by Drake, "Juicy Fruit" by Mtume, "Shot Caller" by French Montana and "Thotiana" by Blueface)
8. "Girls / If You Had My Love" (Mashup, with elements from "Birthday Sex" by Jeremih, "Teenage Fever" by Drake and "In da Club" by 50 Cent)
9. "Booty" (With elements from "Hotline Bling" by Drake)
10. "Gravity"
11. "Limitless"
12. "Ain't Your Mama"
13. "All I Have"
14. "Hold It Don't Drop It"
15. "Te Boté" / "Te Guste"
16. "El Anillo"
17. "Waiting for Tonight" (Hex's Momentous Club Mix)
18. "Dance Again"
19. "On the Floor"
20. "Let's Get Loud"

=== Notes ===
- After her concert in Montreal, Lopez performed a cover of Selena's "Si Una Vez".

== Tour dates ==
List of 2019 concerts
Date (2019)	City	Country	Venue	Attendance	Revenue
June 7 (Note: The June 7, 2019, show at The Forum in Inglewood was originally scheduled to take place on June 12, 2019, at the Staples Center in Los Angeles.)	Inglewood (Note: Billed as Los Angeles.)	United States	The Forum	29,319 / 29,791	$3,733,502
June 8	Inglewood	United States	The Forum	29,319 / 29,791	$3,733,502
June 10	San Diego	United States	Pechanga Arena	8,977 / 10,083	$1,406,062
June 12 (Note: The June 12, 2019, show at the Golden 1 Center in Sacramento was originally scheduled to take place on June 16, 2019.)	Sacramento	United States	Golden 1 Center	13,282 / 13,282	$1,822,144
June 13 (Note: The June 13, 2019, show at the SAP Center in San Jose was originally scheduled to take place on June 15, 2019.)	San Jose	United States	SAP Center	13,072 / 13,072	$1,985,587
June 15 (Note: The June 15, 2019, show at the T-Mobile Arena in Las Vegas was originally scheduled to take place on June 8, 2019.)	Paradise (Note: Billed as Las Vegas.)	United States	T-Mobile Arena	12,847 / 12,847	$1,595,677
June 16 (Note: The June 16, 2019, show at the Talking Stick Resort Arena in Phoenix was originally scheduled to take place on June 7, 2019.)	Phoenix	United States	Talking Stick Resort Arena	13,051 / 13,051	$1,845,010
June 19	Denver	United States	Pepsi Center	12,283 / 12,283	$1,304,508
June 21	San Antonio	United States	AT&T Center	14,881 / 14,913	$2,416,099
June 22	Edinburg	United States	Bert Ogden Arena	8,051 / 8,625	$1,682,498
June 24	Dallas	United States	American Airlines Center	12,913 / 13,946	$1,736,411
June 25	Houston	United States	Toyota Center	12,586 / 12,586	$1,666,656
June 28	Saint Paul	United States	Xcel Energy Center	9,036 / 9,036	$808,174
June 29	Chicago	United States	United Center	27,046 / 28,500	$3,071,281
June 30	Chicago	United States	United Center	27,046 / 28,500	$3,071,281
July 3 (Note: The July 3, 2019, show at the American Family Insurance Amphitheater in Milwaukee is a part of Summerfest.)	Milwaukee	United States	American Family Insurance Amphitheater	12,116 / 23,095	$1,273,567
July 5	Detroit	United States	Little Caesars Arena	12,765 / 12,765	$2,473,000
July 7	Toronto	Canada	Scotiabank Arena	29,102 / 29,355	$3,363,674
July 8	Toronto	Canada	Scotiabank Arena	29,102 / 29,355	$3,363,674
July 10	Montreal	Canada	Bell Centre	15,041 / 15,041	$1,773,086
July 12	New York City	United States	Madison Square Garden	28,066 / 28,066 (Note: The score data for the shows held at the Madison Square Garden in New York City are for the shows held on July 12 and July 15, 2019.)	$5,536,127
July 13 (Note: The July 13, 2019 show at Madison Square Garden in New York City was prematurely ended due to a city-wide power outage, resulting in a July 15 make-up date being added.)	New York City	United States	Madison Square Garden	—N/a	—N/a
July 15	New York City	United States	Madison Square Garden	—	—
July 16	Mansfield	United States	Xfinity Center	14,318 / 14,491	$1,385,288
July 17	Washington, D.C.	United States	Capital One Arena	13,987 / 13,987	$1,810,377
July 19	Newark	United States	Prudential Center	13,227 / 13,227	$2,396,508
July 20	Philadelphia	United States	Wells Fargo Center	13,724 / 13,724	$1,680,234
July 22	Atlanta	United States	State Farm Arena	11,275 / 11,275	$1,226,232
July 23	Orlando	United States	Amway Center	12,860 / 12,860	$2,010,744
July 25	Miami	United States	American Airlines Arena	40,055 / 40,055	$10,285,286
July 26	Miami	United States	American Airlines Arena	40,055 / 40,055	$10,285,286
July 27	Miami	United States	American Airlines Arena	40,055 / 40,055	$10,285,286
August 1	Tel Aviv	Israel	Hayarkon Park	—N/a	—N/a
August 4	Moscow	Russia	VTB Arena	—N/a	—N/a
August 6 (Note: This concert was part of the Regnum Live Concert series.)	Antalya	Turkey	Regnum Carya Golf Resort & Spa	—N/a	—N/a
August 8 (Note: This concert was part of the Marenostrum Festival.)	Fuengirola	Spain	Marenostrum Castle Park	—N/a	—N/a
August 9	El Alamein	Egypt	Seacode	2,000 / 2,000	—N/a
August 11	Saint Petersburg	Russia	CKK Concert Complex	—N/a	—N/a
Total				405,880 / 421,956 (96%)	$60,286,732

== Cancelled dates ==
List of cancelled concerts, showing date, city, country, venue and reason
Date	City	Country	Venue	Reason for cancellation
June 28, 2019	San Juan	Puerto Rico	Coliseo de Puerto Rico Jose Miguel Agrelot	Not specified

== Personnel ==
- Jennifer Lopez – lead vocals
- Kim Burse – music director and supervisor
- Kevin Teasley – music director and ProTools operation

=== Band & Vocalists ===
- Charles Streeter – drums, band leader
- Will Birckhead – bass
- JP Castillo – percussion, background vocals
- James Gabriel – keyboard
- Andy Abad – guitar
- LaNesha Latimer Cuevas – background vocals
- Danielle Withers – background vocals
- Ayden George – background vocals
