= Jennifer Lopez: Up All Night Live in Las Vegas =

Concert residency (2025–2026)

- Residency by Jennifer Lopez
- Promotional graphic
- Location: Paradise, Nevada, U.S.
- Venue: The Colosseum at Caesars Palace
- Start date: December 30, 2025
- End date: March 28, 2026
- No. of shows: 12
- Producer: Caesars Entertainment; Live Nation

Jennifer Lopez concert chronology
- Up All Night: Live in 2025 (2025); Jennifer Lopez: Up All Night Live in Las Vegas (2025–2026)

Jennifer Lopez: Up All Night Live in Las Vegas was the second concert residency by the American entertainer Jennifer Lopez, performed at the Colosseum at Caesars Palace in Paradise, Nevada. The residency opened on December 30, 2025, and closed on March 28, 2026, consisting of 12 shows. This followed her Jennifer Lopez: All I Have (2016–2018) residency at the Zappos Theater. The residency was produced by Caesars Entertainment and Live Nation.

== Background and development ==
Jennifer Lopez announced the residency in May 2025, while she was hosting the American Music Awards. That December, ahead of the show's opening, she began sharing footage from rehearsals to publications, such as Us Weekly and People, respectively.

Directed by Tabitha and Napoleon D'umo, the show's production featured a 17-piece band which included an "all-female string section". In addition to performing her own greatest hits, Lopez performed covers of various Broadway standards, including songs from Funny Girl, West Side Story, Gypsy, Damn Yankees, and Kiss of the Spider Woman.

== Critical response ==
John Katsilometes of the Las Vegas Review-Journal called the show an "expertly executed, high-velocity autobiographical production." Writing for Billboard, Melinda Sheckells reacted positively, writing: "Lopez belted out song after song, hit every dance move and blew through more costume changes than anyone could count, she left it all on the floor of one of the city's most important stages. Every part of the show worked in tandem to usher in a new era for Vegas residencies, leaning more toward the theatrical than a greatest hits rundown."

== Broadcast ==
The residency was recorded for a concert film The JLo Show, set to be released via Paramount+ on November 22, 2026.

== Set list ==
This set list is from the December 30, 2025, concert.

Act I

1. "Let Me Entertain You"
2. "Waiting for Tonight" / "Mambo"
3. "Jenny from the Block"
4. "Do It Well"

Act II

5. "Love Don't Cost a Thing"
6. "I'm a Woman"
7. "Ain't Your Mama"
8. "Louboutins"
9. "Ain't It Funny"
10. "I'm Real"
11. "All I Have"
12. "Get Right"

Act III

13. "Kiss of the Spider Woman"
14. "Whatever Lola Wants"
15. "I'm Into You"
16. "El Anillo"
17. "Young and Beautiful"
18. "If You Had My Love"
19. "Heartbreak Hotel"
20. "Booty"

Act IV

21. "Get Happy"
22. "Dance Again"
23. "Play"
24. "On the Floor"
25. "Tens"
26. "Don't Rain on My Parade"
27. "Let's Get Loud"

=== Notes ===
- During the December 30, 2025, show, the Murder remixes of "Ain't It Funny" and "I'm Real" were performed with Ja Rule.

== Shows ==
List of 2025 concerts
Date (2025)	Attendance	Revenue
December 30	—	—
December 31	—	—

List of 2026 concerts
Date (2026)	Attendance	Revenue
January 2	—	—
January 3	—	—
March 6	—	—
March 7	—	—
March 13	—	—
March 14	—	—
March 20	—	—
March 21	—	—
March 27	—	—
March 28	—	—
