= First Love (Jennifer Lopez song) =

Single by Jennifer Lopez

from the album A.K.A.
- Released: May 1, 2014
- Recorded: February 2014
- Studio: Conway Studios (Los Angeles); Wolf Cousins Studios (Stockholm)
- Genre: Pop; electropop; R&B
- Length: 3:35
- Label: Capitol
- Songwriters: Max Martin; Savan Kotecha; Ilya Salmanzadeh
- Producers: Max Martin; Ilya Salmanzadeh; Peter Carlsson

Jennifer Lopez singles chronology
"We Are One (Ole Ola)" (2014)	"First Love" (2014)	"Booty" (2014)

Music video
- "First Love" on YouTube

"First Love" is a song recorded by American singer Jennifer Lopez for her eighth studio album, A.K.A. (2014). It was written by Max Martin, Savan Kotecha and Ilya Salmanzadeh, and produced by Martin and Ilya, with vocal production being handled by Martin, Peter Carlsson, and Ilya. It was released by Capitol Records as the album's second single on May 1, 2014. The song was first developed when Lopez was talking to Martin, Kotecha and Cory Rooney about relationships during a break from the album recording. A day later, they appeared with the lyrics of the track, and Lopez recorded it.

"First Love" is a pop, electropop and R&B song with synth beats, "hard-hitting percussion" and "big drums" as the song's instrumentation, with critics also noting influences from her previous material. Lyrically, "First Love" talks about finding true love and wishing you would have met the person you're with now years ago, so they can be your first love. The song received positive reviews from most music critics, who commended the track for lifting the bar for high-quality pop music, while also praising its "fun and free feel".

Commercially, "First Love" received minor success on the US Billboard Hot 100 chart, but managed to receive moderate airplay on the US Pop Songs and topped the US Hot Dance Club Songs. It also reached number two in Hong Kong, the top-twenty in Spain and the top-fifty in Italy. The accompanying music video for "First Love" was released on May 29, 2014, and was directed by Anthony Mandler. The black-and-white music video features British model David Gandy and Lopez during love scenes in a desert. Lopez promoted the track with live performances on the 2014 Billboard Music Awards, American Idol, Late Night with Jimmy Fallon, as well as on her concerts throughout 2014 - blending the song with elements of "Ain't No Mountain High Enough" as well as a dance-break.

== Background and release ==
While working on her then-upcoming album, Lopez expressed the interest on working with Swedish record producer and songwriter Max Martin. According to the singer, "I had really wanted to work with Max for many, many years, and it just never happened," she explained. She further commented: "For [A.K.A.] I was like, 'I want to work with you.' I met with him in the summertime, and he was like, 'I'm just going off to do Adele's album!' or somebody he works with all the time. I was like, 'When are you back?', he was like, 'October', I was like, 'I'll wait for you'." About Martin, Lopez added: "He's a super producer, maker of great pop hits. I've always wanted to work with him but our paths [hadn't] crossed. I sought him out." Later, when he got back, they started trying to find the right song to record and Martin eventually called his songwriter partner, American songwriter Savan Kotecha, to work with them on what would become "First Love".

The song was first previewed during a six-song listening party of Lopez's then-upcoming eighth studio album on April 25, 2014. During the event, she also revealed that the song would serve as the album's second single." The artwork for the single was unveiled on April 27 and it features Lopez standing behind a chain-link fence. "First Love" was leaked online on April 30, 2014 and Capitol Records released to digital download a day later. It was also sent to contemporary radio on May 20, 2014. In the United Kingdom, the song was available to digital download on June 8, 2014.

== Recording and writing ==
"For me, it's like that feeling when you find somebody that you are really are into, and you're like, 'Why didn't I meet you years ago? I wouldn't have had to go through all this crap'. But in all seriousness, it's just one of those love songs, like 'I love you, I'm happy that I found you' type of thing."
— Lopez talking about the song's topic.

While taking a break in between recording sessions for A.K.A., Lopez had a discussion with Cory Rooney, Max Martin, and Savan Kotecha about relationships. They talked about "how relationships can be difficult and you have to work at them. And how, when you finally do find that person you wish you had found them years ago." A couple of days later, Martin and Kotecha called Lopez and told her that they came up with a song based on the conversation they had. According to Lopez: "I was on the set of [American] Idol, doing the Hollywood Week, and they wanted to come over and play it for me, they were so excited. They came over at lunch time, to my small dressing room backstage at Idol to play this song and I just loved it. It captured this great feeling in a simple way. I feel like the best songs are like that. It was pretty exciting, we recorded it in the next couple of days."

"First Love" was written by Martin, Kotecha and Swedish songwriter Ilya Salmanzadeh, with production being handled by Martin and Ilya. It was recorded at Conway Studios, Los Angeles, California, and at Wolf Cousin Studios, Stockholm, Sweden. Jeanette Olsson provided background vocals, while Martin and Ilya were also responsible for programming and vocal production, with Peter Carlsson serving as the latter's. Serban Ghenea mixed the song at MixStar Studios, Virginia Beach, and John Hanes engineered the track.

== Music and lyrics ==
"First Love" (2014)
A 19-second sample of "First Love", with Lopez singing about how she wishes her new love would be her first, so she wouldn't have to go through so many bad relationships, while an electropop and synth-heavy sound is played.

"First Love" is an uptempo pop, electropop and R&B song with a synth heavy sound. Its instrumentation consist in "hard-hitting percussion" and "big drums". The song runs for a duration of three minutes and thirty-five seconds (3:35).The vocal range spans from C4-D5. Ziwei of Spin or Bin Music wrote the song is reminiscent of her previous singles "If You Had My Love" (1999) and "Love Don't Cost a Thing" (2001). Jeff Benjamin of Fuse TV found the song to be reminiscent of her song "(What Is) Love?" (2011)".

Lyrically, "First Love" talks about meeting somebody and finally feeling like it's the one and wishing you had met them years before. For Andy Walsh of Renowned for Sound, the song "deal[s] with the stars romantic past and the often-confusing side of relationships." Caroline Sullivan of The Guardian noted that the track "sweetly extols the pleasure of finding the right person long past the first flush of youth." According to Lopez, "The truth is it really is just about a feeling — the feeling of falling, of falling in love, the feeling of you've found the one, or that this person that you're with, you wish you would've met them years ago," she said. "So for me it was less about telling a story, and more about capturing that feeling." In the beginning, she sings: "And I wasn't looking for someone new / Til you came down / Giving me the best the time I've had." During the chorus, she admits: "I wish you were my first love / 'Cos if you were my first / Baby there wouldn't have been no second, third or fourth love".

== Critical reception ==
The song received generally positive reviews from music critics, who agreed the track is one of the best songs on the album. Amaya Mendizabal of Billboard enjoyed its "fun and free feel," praising Max Martin for "liv[ing] up to his legacy, creating a sound reminiscent of past summertime hits," also noting that it "evokes a nostalgic air that will resonate with true J.Lo fans." Writing for Fuse TV, Jeff Benjamin praised the singer for "successfully straddl[ing] the line between pop and hip-hop on this song, as she always does." Jazz Tangcay of SoSoGay called it "a pop-centric song and catchy on the first listen," while Lydia Jenkin of The New Zealand Herald noted that the track "has the kind of lively spirit and hummability that's made J-Lo a household name in the past, and seems an effortless throwaway hit." Stephen Thomas Erlewine of AllMusic remarked that "she's on firmer territory on 'First Love'." while Sarah Rodman of Boston Globe pointed out that it "manages to be sexy and booming."

Ziwei of Spin or Bin Music wrote the song is "a very welcomed change" after "I Luh Ya Papi", which he described as "the song that almost singlehandedly destroyed the English language." Amy Davidson from Digital Spy agreed, writing that its lyrics are so convincent that it "redeems the crowded jumble we heard on 'I Luh Ya Papi'." Davidson praised the track, calling it "seductive pop that sits on the right side of J-Lo's hip hop influences." Jim Farber of New York Daily News praised the song for "fulfill[ing] its musical mission: being a sweet piece of candy pop", while Glenn Gamboa of Newsday wrote the bouncy track captures "some of the lighthearted dance-pop charm of songs from On the 6." Having named the best song on the album, Devone Jones of PopMatters noted that Lopez "happens to strike gold with a track that sounds like an updated demo of a hit made for Britney Spears, [which] doesn't mean Jenny fails to put her own stamp on the track. [In fact], she makes it her own and sounds alive for the first time in a long time. While claiming that the singer "accepts the gift and turns on the charm to deliver her best single in ages," Saeed Saeed of The National also praised Max Martin for "channel[ing] his 1990s heyday with a sweet, summery sound full of synths and live drums." In contrast to the positive response, Alexa Camp of Slant Magazine called it "forgettable", writing that the fact that the song gets the full single treatment suggests that Lopez probably shouldn't add A&R exec to her extensive résumé anytime soon.

== Commercial performance ==
"First Love" received minor impact on the charts, especially on the Billboard charts, where it managed to chart on the Billboard Hot 100 at number 87, its debut peak. However, the song fared better on radio and in the clubs, where it reached a peak of number 21 on the Mainstream Top 40 chart and topped the Hot Dance Club Songs, becoming her 15th number-one there. With that feat, she tied with Donna Summer for the seventh-most toppers in the chart's 38-year history. In the UK, the song only managed to debut at number 63; her lowest charting-single since "Papi" (2011). In Ireland, it debuted at number 79. The song fared somewhat better in Italy and Spain, where it reached a peak of numbers 41 and 15, respectively. In South Korea, it managed to debut at number 15, with first-week sales of 7,582 copies.

== Music video ==
=== Background and shooting ===
"I've been asked if I'd take part in music videos before and I've always said no, but I jumped at the chance of working with a music icon such as Jennifer. The conditions to shoot in were very challenging due to the weather - we were in the desert outside LA and the winds were incredibly strong and we had to deal with plummeting temperatures and sandstorms - but the atmosphere on set was great and we all had a lot of fun."

— David Gandy talking about why he accepted to do the music video.

A music video for the song was shot in the California desert outside of Los Angeles in early May, with Anthony Mandler being the director. Lopez claimed that the video shoot was the hardest she's done in her career. "It was like the apocalypse," she said on iHeartRadio. "It was like purgatory. I was waiting for frogs to fall out of the sky. It was a wind storm. Literally, it felt like we were in the middle of a tornado. There was this much dust on my face. We looked like we were covered up on soot. And it was freezing. And of course, you know, in the video I'm not wearing all that much." Regarding the video's concept, she elaborated:

"Just the title, 'First Love,' you think of so many different visuals that can go with that. The song gives you a feeling more than anything, because it's gonna mean so many different things for so many different people. It's not about your first love; it's just, 'I wish you were the person I had met early and then I wouldn't have had to go through all these things.' I just think that was such a beautiful sentiment."

On May 27, 2014, Lopez teased the video on her Instagram account, uploading a sneak peek of it, also announcing that it would be fully released the same day on Entertainment Tonight. Lopez also revealed to People, "We talked a lot about whether we would do a little bit of color or pops of color. But Anthony [the director] felt strongly that it be all in black and white. It's a sweet and sexy video, I think," she said. "It definitely captures the feeling of the song."

=== Synopsis and reception ===
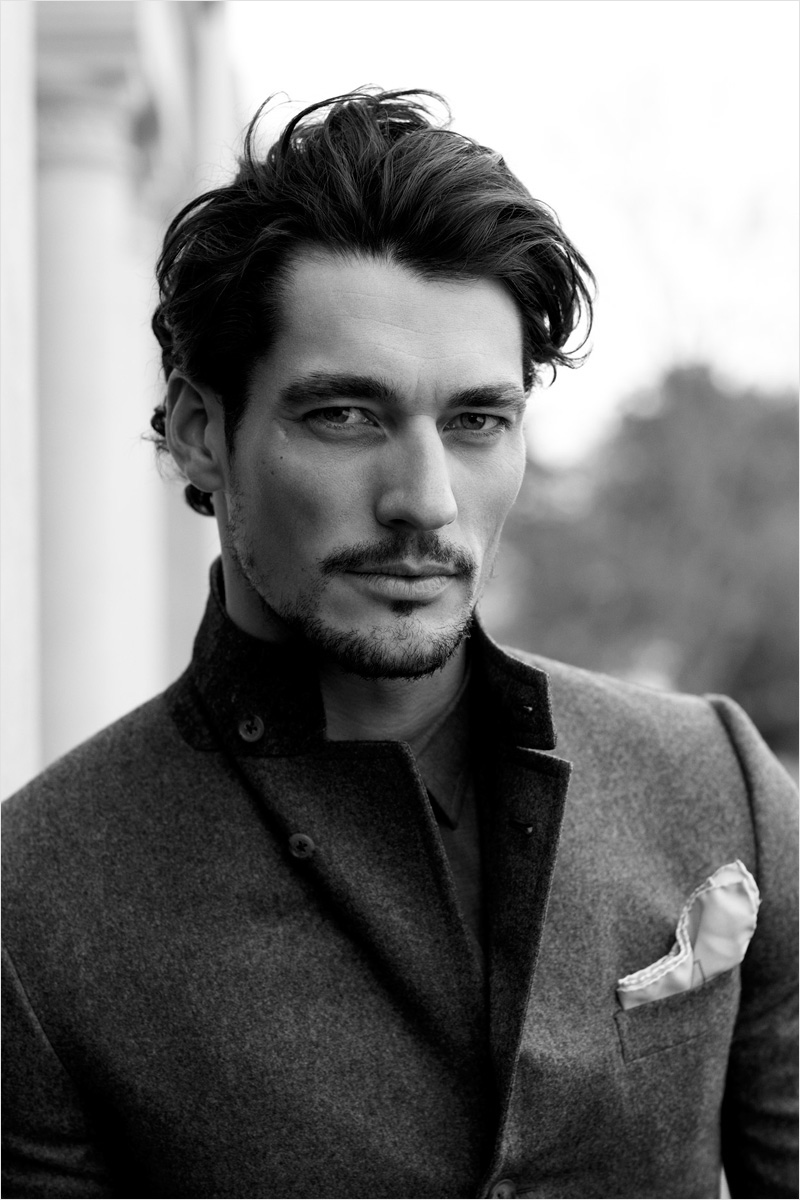
British model David Gandy (pictured) is Lopez's love interest in the video.

The black-and-white music video starts with Lopez exclaiming, "I knew I had to leave the world behind me to find out who I was," as she wanders the Californian desert in "her finest couture gown," as noted by Mike Wass from Idolator. "I knew that love would never search for me, that I would have to search for it," she continues. It then cuts to the singer in an Issa De'mar plunging black bathing suit, as she writhes around on the ground in the desert, while a mysterious biker arrives in the desert in full motorcycle gear. Later, the video sees Lopez wearing a variety of outfits before encountering British model David Gandy.

The music video was received with positive response from most critics. Mike Wass of Idolator called it her "sexiest visual since 2011's breathtaking 'I'm Into You', also noting that "it's a fairly simple set-up but, in director Anthony Mandler's capable hands, it turns out to be an absolute feast for the eyes. The black-and-white photography is gorgeous, J.Lo has never looked better and her co-star isn't exactly hard on the eyes either." Rachel McRady of US Weekly praised Lopez for looking "more fit and fabulous than ever after more than two decades in the business." Rebecca Macatee of E! News wrote that the singer "flaunts insanely sexy body" in the video, while Patrick Gomez of People noted that she "continues to look half her age in the sensual music video." Lucas Villa of AXS found the video to be reminiscent of late director Herb Ritts' classic clips. Carolyn Menyes of Music Times felt that the video "looks like a fancy old school perfume ad."

== Live performances ==
Lopez first performed "First Love" during the 2014 Billboard Music Awards, where she was awarded with the 2014 Icon Award. During the performance, Lopez blended "First Love" with Motown classic 'Ain't No Mountain High Enough.' Michelle McGahan of Pop Crush praised Lopez for "not only look[ing] jaw-dropping in a one-shoulder, sparkly black dress, but she belted out the tune with such fervor and showed the world just how well she can really move. (We're talking, rivaling Beyoncé. That's how good her performance was!) The singer looked so fierce and she so totally nailed the number." She also performed the same medley during her free concert in the Bronx, on June 4, 2014. Lopez also performed the track during the finale of the thirteenth season of the American Idol, wearing a unique blue one-piece. Halfway through "First Love," Jennifer shouted that she was ready to dance — and started to run off the stage and jumped onto the judge's table where she showed some sexy moves. Backed by a large group of dancers, Lopez returned to the stage for a quick dance break before reminding everyone, "I'm still Jenny from the Block!". The song was also part of Lopez's setlist during her concerts in 2014, including the "Powerhouse 2014" and the "iHeartRadio Ultimate Pool Party", on June 28, 2014.

== Charts ==
Weekly chart performance for "First Love"
Chart (2014)	Peak position
Canada CHR/Top 40 (Billboard)	34
Finland (Suomen virallinen radiosoittolista)	65
France (SNEP)	193
Ireland (IRMA)	79
Italy (FIMI)	41
Japan Hot 100 (Billboard)	77
Russia (Tophit Weekly General Airplay)	200
Scottish Singles Sales (Official Charts)	68
Slovakia Airplay (ČNS IFPI)	50
South Korea (Gaon International Download Chart)	15
South Korea (Gaon International Digital Chart)	20
Slovenia (SloTop50)	42
Spain (Promusicae)	15
UK Singles (Official Charts)	63
US Billboard Hot 100	87
US Dance Club Songs (Billboard)	1
US Pop Airplay (Billboard)	21
US Rhythmic Airplay (Billboard)	40

=== Year-end charts ===
Chart (2014)	Position
US Billboard Dance Club Songs	7

== Release history ==
Country	Date	Format	Label
Canada	May 1, 2014	Digital download	Universal
United States	May 1, 2014	Digital download	Capitol
France	May 3, 2014	Digital download	Universal
Germany	May 3, 2014	Digital download	Universal
Italy	May 3, 2014	Digital download	Universal
Spain	May 3, 2014	Digital download	Universal
United States	May 20, 2014	Mainstream radio	Capitol
United Kingdom	June 8, 2014	Digital download	Capitol UK

== See also ==
- List of number-one dance singles of 2014 (U.S.)
