= Jennifer Lopez: All I Have =

Concert residency by Jennifer Lopez

- Residency by Jennifer Lopez
- Location: Paradise, Nevada, U.S.
- Venue: Zappos Theater
- Start date: January 20, 2016
- End date: September 29, 2018
- Legs: 10
- No. of shows: 121
- Attendance: 487,303
- Box office: US $101.9 million

Jennifer Lopez concert chronology
- Enrique Iglesias & Jennifer Lopez Tour (2012); All I Have (2016–2018); It's My Party (2019)
Jennifer Lopez concert residency chronology
Let's Get Loud (2001)	All I Have (2018–2024)	Jennifer Lopez: Up All Night Live in Las Vegas (2025–2026)

Jennifer Lopez: All I Have was the first concert residency by American entertainer Jennifer Lopez. Performed at the Zappos Theater located in the Planet Hollywood Resort & Casino on the Las Vegas Strip in Paradise, Nevada, the residency began on January 20, 2016 and concluded on September 29, 2018. The show has received critical acclaim for its production and Lopez's showmanship. The residency grossed $101.9 million after 120 shows, making it the sixth highest-grossing Las Vegas residency of all time, and the top residency by a Latin artist.

== Background and development ==
It was first reported that Lopez had been offered a Las Vegas residency at Planet Hollywood in October 2014, in a deal which was said to be worth $350,000 per night. The residency was officially confirmed in May 2015. "The show is going to be a multifaceted, high-energy 'Jenny from the Block' party, mixing all aspects of what my fans and I love," Lopez stated. She announced on September 19, 2015, during her performance at the iHeartRadio Music Festival 2015 that her 2016 residency was named "All I Have" while a promotional poster was being displayed on the stage's backdrop.

== Critical response ==
Eve Barlow of The Guardian gave the show 5/5 stars and commended it as "two hours of high-octane entertainment", writing: "Tonight, Lopez promised to give us all she had. Via a catalogue spanning many genres, flavours and dance moves, she delivered a heck of a party. To borrow from her 2001 smash hit 'Play': that’s the hotness right there." Billboard rated the residency's opening night 4.5/5 stars, with Katie Atkinson stating, "It's not surprising that Lopez was tailor-made for Vegas." Writing for Time magazine, Nolan Feeney praised the show as "a spectacle as lively and extravagant as the city itself" while also noting, "the latest in a slew of pop stars to set up shop in Vegas, she brings a showmanship that’s hard to top". Feeney particularly favored the Latin music set, stating that it was "the most electrifying part" of the residency. Gerrick D. Kennedy of the Los Angeles Times dubbed Lopez "Queen of the Strip" and observed that "the production aims, and greatly succeeds, at setting a new gold standard for Vegas popstar showcases", while also commenting on Lopez's showmanship and sex appeal.

MTV News' Molly Lambert called the residency "a quintessentially Las Vegas show", writing: "This sort of robust entertainment is what we expect from Vegas: A glamorous star who can act, dance, and sing is really a nostalgic throwback — an old-fashioned kind of star-as-star — someone superior to mere human beings." Lambert added: "As for the singing? Well, a lot of it sounds live, although there are clearly backing tracks to help out." USA Today writer Jaleesa M. Jones described it as "a transcendent experience that harked back to the early 00's (when she was still rocking track suits and gelled-down baby hairs) while celebrating the best of the present (all bejeweled everything)." Mike Weatherford of the Las Vegas Review-Journal commented that "the showcase is far easier on the eyes than the ears. It’s more like a production show with a centerpiece." Rolling Stone writer Stephen L. Betts described Lopez's rendition of "I Hope You Dance" by country singer Lee Ann Womack as one of the show's highlights, calling it "emotional".

== Commercial reception ==
Tickets for the residency were available for sale to the public on May 16, 2015, through Ticketmaster for all dates with ticket prices ranging from US$59-$416. The concert which took place on August 13, 2016 earned over $1 million in revenue, becoming Planet Hollywood's highest-grossing show to date, breaking the previous box office record for a single show, previously set by Britney: Piece of Me. The record was once again broken by the final show of Britney: Piece of Me in December 2017. It was the most successful Las Vegas residency of 2016, grossing $34.6 million. By the 116th show on September 22, 2018, the residency had sold a total of 467,314 tickets, grossing $97.5 million. Celebrities who have attended the show include: Justin Bieber, Jeremy Bieber, Khloe Kardashian, Kim Kardashian, Jessica Alba, Becky G, Kerry Washington, Demi Lovato, Nick Jonas, Gloria Trevi, Drake, Selena Gomez, Sofia Vergara, Ellen DeGeneres, Smokey Robinson, Marc Anthony, Heidi Klum, Gwen Stefani, Laverne Cox, Kevin Hart, Pitbull, LL Cool J, Ne-Yo, Ja Rule, Drew Barrymore, Sarah Michelle Gellar, Jerry Lewis and Dua Lipa.

== Set list ==
The following set list is representative of the show on January 20, 2016. It is not representative of all concerts for the duration of the show.

1. "If You Had My Love" (With elements from "The Glamorous Life" by Sheila E.)
2. "Love Don't Cost a Thing"
3. "A Lot of Livin' to Do"
4. "Get Right"
5. Interlude (With elements from "Puerto Rico" by Frankie Cutlass and "Milly Rock" by 2 Milly)
6. "I'm Real" (Murder Remix)
7. "Feelin' So Good" (With additional elements from "Set It Off" by Strafe)
8. "Jenny from the Block" (With elements from "Started from the Bottom" by Drake, "Juicy Fruit" by Mtume and "Shot Caller" by French Montana)
9. "I'm Into You" (With elements from "Freaks" by Vicious)
10. "Girls" (With elements from "If You Had My Love")
11. "Booty" (With elements from "Hotline Bling" by Drake)
12. "Feel the Light"
13. "I Hope You Dance"
14. Interlude (With elements from "Never Too Much" by Luther Vandross)
15. "Ain't It Funny" (Murder Remix)
16. "Very Special / All I Have"
17. "Hold It Don't Drop It"
18. "Quimbara" / "Bemba Colorá"
19. "¿Quién será?"
20. "Let's Get Loud"
21. "Tens"
22. "Waiting for Tonight"
23. "Dance Again"
24. "On the Floor"

=== Notes ===
- On the opening night, January 20, 2016, Lopez was joined on stage by guest performers Ja Rule, Ne-Yo and Pitbull.

== Shows ==
List of 2016 performances
Date	Attendance	Revenue
January 20, 2016	43,576 / 43,576	$8,831,592
January 22, 2016	43,576 / 43,576	$8,831,592
January 23, 2016	43,576 / 43,576	$8,831,592
January 27, 2016	43,576 / 43,576	$8,831,592
January 29, 2016	43,576 / 43,576	$8,831,592
January 30, 2016	43,576 / 43,576	$8,831,592
February 3, 2016	43,576 / 43,576	$8,831,592
February 5, 2016	43,576 / 43,576	$8,831,592
February 6, 2016	43,576 / 43,576	$8,831,592
February 9, 2016	43,576 / 43,576	$8,831,592
May 22, 2016	52,488 / 53,589	$11,518,415
May 25, 2016	52,488 / 53,589	$11,518,415
May 27, 2016	52,488 / 53,589	$11,518,415
May 28, 2016	52,488 / 53,589	$11,518,415
May 29, 2016	52,488 / 53,589	$11,518,415
June 1, 2016	52,488 / 53,589	$11,518,415
June 3, 2016	52,488 / 53,589	$11,518,415
June 4, 2016	52,488 / 53,589	$11,518,415
June 8, 2016	52,488 / 53,589	$11,518,415
June 10, 2016	52,488 / 53,589	$11,518,415
June 11, 2016	52,488 / 53,589	$11,518,415
June 12, 2016	52,488 / 53,589	$11,518,415
July 20, 2016	51,338 / 53,949	$10,324,156
July 22, 2016	51,338 / 53,949	$10,324,156
July 23, 2016	51,338 / 53,949	$10,324,156
July 27, 2016	51,338 / 53,949	$10,324,156
July 29, 2016	51,338 / 53,949	$10,324,156
July 30, 2016	51,338 / 53,949	$10,324,156
August 3, 2016	51,338 / 53,949	$10,324,156
August 5, 2016	51,338 / 53,949	$10,324,156
August 6, 2016	51,338 / 53,949	$10,324,156
August 10, 2016	51,338 / 53,949	$10,324,156
August 12, 2016	51,338 / 53,949	$10,324,156
August 13, 2016	51,338 / 53,949	$10,324,156
December 9, 2016	20,408 / 22,332	$4,229,985
December 10, 2016	20,408 / 22,332	$4,229,985
December 13, 2016	20,408 / 22,332	$4,229,985
December 16, 2016	20,408 / 22,332	$4,229,985
December 17, 2016	20,408 / 22,332	$4,229,985
Total	167,810 / 173,446 (96.8%)	$34,904,148

List of 2017 performances
Date	Attendance	Revenue
February 8, 2017	36,958 / 39,653	$7,275,365
February 10, 2017	36,958 / 39,653	$7,275,365
February 11, 2017	36,958 / 39,653	$7,275,365
February 14, 2017	36,958 / 39,653	$7,275,365
February 17, 2017	36,958 / 39,653	$7,275,365
February 18, 2017	36,958 / 39,653	$7,275,365
February 21, 2017	36,958 / 39,653	$7,275,365
February 24, 2017	36,958 / 39,653	$7,275,365
February 25, 2017	36,958 / 39,653	$7,275,365
May 24, 2017	—	—
May 26, 2017	—	—
May 27, 2017	—	—
May 28, 2017	—	—
May 31, 2017	—	—
June 2, 2017	—	—
June 3, 2017	—	—
June 7, 2017	—	—
June 9, 2017	—	—
June 10, 2017	—	—
June 11, 2017	—	—
September 6, 2017	—	—
September 8, 2017	—	—
September 9, 2017	—	—
September 13, 2017	—	—
September 15, 2017	—	—
September 16, 2017	—	—
September 20, 2017	—	—
September 22, 2017	—	—
September 23, 2017	—	—
September 27, 2017	—	—
September 29, 2017	—	—
September 30, 2017	—	—

List of 2018 performances
Date	Attendance	Revenue
February 21, 2018	8,574 / 9,007	$1,689,417
February 28, 2018	8,574 / 9,007	$1,689,417
March 2, 2018	24,473 / 26,249	$4,677,007
March 3, 2018	24,473 / 26,249	$4,677,007
March 24, 2018	24,473 / 26,249	$4,677,007
March 28, 2018	24,473 / 26,249	$4,677,007
March 30, 2018	24,473 / 26,249	$4,677,007
March 31, 2018	24,473 / 26,249	$4,677,007
April 4, 2018	34,786 / 41,305	$6,292,505
April 6, 2018	34,786 / 41,305	$6,292,505
April 7, 2018	34,786 / 41,305	$6,292,505
April 10, 2018	34,786 / 41,305	$6,292,505
April 11, 2018	34,786 / 41,305	$6,292,505
April 13, 2018	34,786 / 41,305	$6,292,505
April 14, 2018	34,786 / 41,305	$6,292,505
April 17, 2018	34,786 / 41,305	$6,292,505
April 18, 2018	34,786 / 41,305	$6,292,505
April 20, 2018	34,786 / 41,305	$6,292,505
April 21, 2018	34,786 / 41,305	$6,292,505
May 16, 2018	32,753 / 39,901	$6,194,547
May 18, 2018	32,753 / 39,901	$6,194,547
May 19, 2018	32,753 / 39,901	$6,194,547
May 22, 2018	32,753 / 39,901	$6,194,547
May 25, 2018	32,753 / 39,901	$6,194,547
May 26, 2018	32,753 / 39,901	$6,194,547
May 27, 2018	32,753 / 39,901	$6,194,547
May 30, 2018	32,753 / 39,901	$6,194,547
June 1, 2018	32,753 / 39,901	$6,194,547
June 2, 2018	32,753 / 39,901	$6,194,547
June 6, 2018	21,478 / 24,463	$4,108,431
June 8, 2018	21,478 / 24,463	$4,108,431
June 9, 2018	21,478 / 24,463	$4,108,431
June 14, 2018	21,478 / 24,463	$4,108,431
June 15, 2018	21,478 / 24,463	$4,108,431
June 16, 2018	21,478 / 24,463	$4,108,431
September 2, 2018	17,860 / 18,905	$3,773,203
September 5, 2018	17,860 / 18,905	$3,773,203
September 7, 2018	17,860 / 18,905	$3,773,203
September 8, 2018	17,860 / 18,905	$3,773,203
September 12, 2018	12,419 / 12,946	$2,576,956
September 14, 2018	12,419 / 12,946	$2,576,956
September 15, 2018	12,419 / 12,946	$2,576,956
September 16, 2018	18,959 / 19,076	$4,274,801
September 19, 2018	18,959 / 19,076	$4,274,801
September 21, 2018	18,959 / 19,076	$4,274,801
September 22, 2018	18,959 / 19,076	$4,274,801
September 25, 2018	19,989 / 20,030	$4,428,356
September 26, 2018	19,989 / 20,030	$4,428,356
September 28, 2018	19,989 / 20,030	$4,428,356
September 29, 2018	19,989 / 20,030	$4,428,356
Total	191,291 / 211,882 (90.3%)	

== Cancelled shows ==
List of cancelled performances
Date	Reason for cancellation
October 4, 2017	2017 Las Vegas shooting
October 6, 2017	2017 Las Vegas shooting
October 7, 2017	2017 Las Vegas shooting

== See also ==
- List of highest-grossing concert series at a single venue
