= Jennifer Lopez: Halftime =

2022 American documentary film

- Promotional poster
- Directed by: Amanda Micheli
- Produced by: Benny Medina; Elaine Goldsmith-Thomas; Dave Broome; Angus Wall; Terry Leonard; Jennifer Sofio Hall; Kent Kubena; Serin Marshall
- Starring: Jennifer Lopez
- Cinematography: Jason Bergh
- Edited by: Carol Martori
- Music by: Antonio Pinto
- Production companies: Universal Television Alternative Studio; Nuyorican Productions; Twentyfive/Seven Productions; MakeMake
- Distributed by: Netflix
- Release dates: June 8, 2022 (Tribeca); June 14, 2022
- Running time: 95 minutes
- Country: United States
- Language: English

Jennifer Lopez: Halftime is a 2022 American Netflix original documentary film directed by Amanda Micheli. Its story follows the career of Jennifer Lopez, with a heavy focus on her performance at the Super Bowl LIV halftime show and her film Hustlers (2019). The film premiered at the opening night of the 2022 Tribeca Film Festival, and was released on Netflix on June 14, 2022.

Lopez re-recorded an orchestra version of the song entitled "Same Girl (Halftime Remix)" featuring French Montana along with another song, a rendition of "This Land Is Your Land" / "America the Beautiful", to coincide with the release of the film.

== Cast ==
- Jennifer Lopez
- Shakira
- Ben Affleck
- Adam Blackstone
- Hamish Hamilton
- Lorene Scafaria
- Jimmy Fallon (archive footage from The Tonight Show)
- Julia Stiles
- Constance Wu
- Lili Reinhart (archive footage from The Hollywood Reporter)
- Keke Palmer (archive footage from The Hollywood Reporter)
- Christy Lemire
- Rocco Leo Gaglioti(archive footage from Fashion News Live)

== Release ==
The film premiered as the opening night film at the Tribeca Film Festival on June 8, 2022, and on Netflix on June 14, 2022.

The film debuted at No. 2 worldwide on Netflix on its second day of streaming, behind Hustle starring Adam Sandler.

Between June 12, 2022, and June 26, 2022, the documentary was watched for 27.25 million hours on Netflix.

== Reception ==
Overall, the documentary has garnered positive reviews from film critics and the general public alike. The film has an 84% approval rating on Rotten Tomatoes based on 37 reviews. Richard Roeper of the Chicago Sun Times gave the film 3 out of 4 stars, calling it "a solid, entertaining, insider's look at the life and times of a once-aspiring singer-dancer-actress from the Bronx who left home at 18 to pursue her dreams, got her first big break as a 'Fly Girl' on In Living Color, and for the last three decades has starred in some 40 major motion pictures and has sold more than 75 million records worldwide." Adam Green of The Detroit News called it "an inspirational look at someone who has overcome the odds and continues to fight to be taken seriously and to have her voice be heard." Peter Sobczynski of RogerEbert.com gave the film 2 out of 4 stars and concluded that it "is unlikely to majorly shift anyone's thoughts on Jennifer Lopez."

=== Accolades ===
Award	Date of ceremony	Category	Recipient	Result	Ref.
Hollywood Music in Media Awards	November 16, 2022	Best Music Documentary/Special Program	Halftime – Produced by Courtney Baxter, Jason B. Bergh, Bernardo Loyola, Christopher Rouse, Yong Yam; Directed by Amanda Micheli and Sam Wrench	Nominated	
iHeartRadio Music Awards	March 27, 2023	Favorite Documentary	Halftime – Jennifer Lopez	Nominated	
MTV Movie & TV Awards	May 7, 2023	Best Music Documentary	Halftime	Nominated	
