= I Luh Ya Papi =

Single by Jennifer Lopez featuring French Montana

from the album A.K.A.
- Released: March 11, 2014
- Recorded: 2014
- Studio: Doppler (Atlanta, Georgia)
- Genre: Hip hop; synth-pop
- Length: 3:27
- Label: Capitol
- Songwriters: Noel "Detail" Fisher; Andre Proctor; Karim Kharbouch; Jennifer Lopez
- Producers: Detail; Cory Rooney

Jennifer Lopez singles chronology
| "Adrenalina" (2014) | "I Luh Ya Papi" (2014) | "We Are One (Ole Ola)" (2014) |

French Montana singles chronology
| "Loyal" (2013) | "I Luh Ya Papi" (2014) | "They Don't Love You No More" (2014) |

Music video
- "I Luh Ya Papi" on YouTube

"I Luh Ya Papi" is a song recorded by American singer Jennifer Lopez for her eighth studio album, A.K.A. (2014). Featuring guest vocals from American rapper French Montana, the song was released on March 11, 2014 as the lead single from the album by Capitol Records. The song was written and produced by Noel "Detail" Fisher, with additional writing from Andre Proctor, Karim Kharbouch, and Lopez. Cory Rooney and Fisher provided vocal production for the song. Musically, "I Luh Ya Papi" is a hip hop song, backed with synths and metallic beats, that lyrically contains innuendoes and references to Lopez's body.

"I Luh Ya Papi" received generally positive reviews from music critics, who praised the song's catchy chorus, as well as its playfulness, but criticized its title. The song's accompanying music video was shot by director Jessy Terrero, a previous collaborator of Lopez's. The video was filmed in Miami, Florida and depicts her in fantasy, following a concept of Lopez objectifying males. The video was met with positive reviews from critics for confronting music industry sexism. The single was promoted with a performance on season thirteen of American Idol, where Lopez also served as a judge, as well as on Lopez's concerts throughout 2014, including Powerhouse 2014 and her free concert in the Bronx.

== Background and release ==
I feel blessed, I come from the South Bronx, from the same street that she came from. Working with her is a blessing for me, this record is big just for the fact that we both came from the South Bronx and did it."

— French Montana on working with Lopez.

After the release of her first greatest hits compilation Dance Again... the Hits (2012), Jennifer Lopez went on to her first tour, the Dance Again World Tour, and after completing it, she started writing and recording songs for the project. In May 2013, Lopez released "Live It Up", featuring Pitbull and produced by RedOne, which received generally favorable reviews from music critics, but failed to match the success of Lopez's previous collaborations with Pitbull and RedOne. After postponing the album multiple times, she admitted that, "I'm more a believer of letting it gain momentum. Let there be demand for the album by putting out some great music first." After releasing the promotional singles "Same Girl" and "Girls" in early 2014, Lopez announced "I Luh Ya Papi" as the project's lead-single. The single's cover art was revealed on March 4, 2014, with Lopez wearing a "white hot outfit and slick ponytail on a yacht", as described by Mike Wass of Idolator.

A version of "I Luh Ya Papi" featuring French Montana premiered on the radio station Power 106 on March 5, 2014, and it became available to digital download on March 11, 2014. Speaking of her decision to have French Montana feature, Lopez said, "We're both from New York, and we both have similar backgrounds, and I wanted this record to have that vibe and he was just perfect for it so I was so happy when he heard this record and wanted to be a part of it." According to Nielsen BDS, "I Luh Ya Papi" was the second most added song to rhythmic radio stations in Canada.

== Recording and writing ==
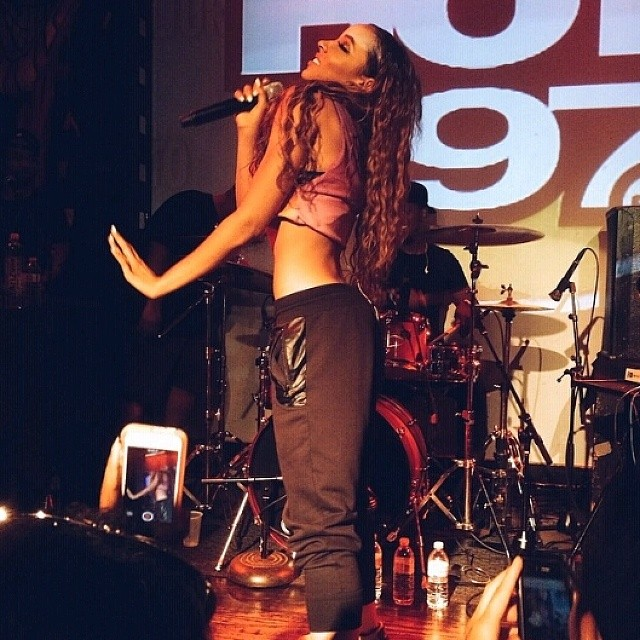
Tinashe recorded an early version of the song, originally titled "I Luh You Nigga".

"I Luh Ya Papi" originated as a song called "I Luh You Nigga" which was written by American singer-songwriter Tinashe for her debut studio album, Aquarius. According to Tinashe, she went on to an early session with record producer Detail and they recorded the track, which was planned to be the singer's first single. Later, Detail was in a session with Jennifer Lopez and he played the track to her, prompting the singer to like it and cut her version. As claimed by Tinashe, "they switched the swag up a little bit," adding: "One day Detail calls me and is like 'B-T-dubs, J. Lo is singing that song.' I didn't believe it at first, I thought he was just not trying to give it to me for some reason. I was like 'J. Lo does not want that song, she's not gonna sing that.' And then it came out. I guess she wanted it."

"I Luh Ya Papi" was re-written by Noel Fisher, Andre Proctor, Karim Kharbouch and Jennifer Lopez, with production being handled by Noel "Detail" Fisher, who was also responsible for vocal production, along with Cory Rooney. It features a rap verse by French Montana, whose vocals were recorded by Max Unruh at Doppler Studios in Atlanta, while the song was mixed by Jayeen Joshua at Larrabee Sound Studios in North Hollywood, California.

== Composition and lyrics ==
"I Luh Ya Papi" is a hip hop song with a synth-pop melody. According to Michael Cragg of The Guardian, the song is "all a bit bonkers", with synths sliding in reverse and metallic beats "clanking in the distance". Jeff Benjamin of Fuse.tv also called the production of the song a "mixing electro bloops with a hip hop beat". Carolyne Menyes of Music Times added that the song has "some funky beats and a more R&B influence than her typical Latin flavor." Both Craig Mathieson of The Sydney Morning Herald and Saeed Saeed of The National also saw Latin influences on the track, with the first calling it a "latin hip-hop" song, and the latter naming it a "latin-tinged" bouncy track.

In "I Luh Ya Papi", Lopez raps and sings in three different accents. Lyrically, the song is an unashamed ode to sex. For Menyes, the song "finds her in lyrically familiar territory: she's still that same ol' girl from the Bronx, she loves her man and, well, together her and her 'Papi' have been through it all together and she still luhs him." Many critics noted that the song has an "addictive, repetitive 'I luh ya Papi, I I luh ya, luh ya, luh ya, luh ya Papi' hook."

== Critical response ==
"I Luh Ya Papi" was met with favorable reception from music critics, although there was criticism directed towards its title. While criticizing the song for being "ridiculously-titled", Michael Cragg of The Guardian wrote that the hook "may actually require surgery to get out of your head". Scott T. Sterling of Radio.com called the song a "sunny and infectious tune [that] is sure to soundtrack many beach parties." Amaya Mendizabal of Billboard noted that the song "serves to let you fiercely unleash your inner sass." Anupa Mistry of Spin considered the song "a new take on that thing she does best: flirty street-pop team-ups with once-grimy rappers, in this case South Bronx sheikh French Montana." while Nick Murray of Rolling Stone named it a "summer-anthem contender." Sarah Rodman of Boston Globe classified it as "playfully undulating", while Jazz Tangcay of So So Gay felt the song as "fun, but not a standout."

While feeling "shame" about its name, Caroline Sullivan from The Guardian praised the song for ha[ving] a ferocious hookline," while Saeed Saeed of The National called it "quite catchy if you manage to ignore that grating chorus." Reed Jackson of XXL Magazine added that the song has a "catchy-as-hell chorus and goofy sweet rhymes by French." Melissa Maerz wrote for Entertainment Weekly that the "only song [on the album] that even approaches classic J. Lo is the single 'I Luh Ya Papi', a bubbly sung-spoken jam that finds her lovin' on backseat hookups and hatin' on enunciation." Alexa Camp of Slant Magazine agreed, writing that "aside from the album's lead single, 'I Luh Ya Papi,' which is ridiculous in all the right ways, Jenny from the Block seems to have largely forgotten the fun this time around." In a less favorable vein, Stephen Thomas Erlewine from Allmusic noted that "when the scale tips too heavily toward rhythm--as it does on 'Booty' and 'I Luh Ya Papi'--the productions don't do Lopez many favors, burying her in their thrum." Writing for PopMatters, Devone Jones thought that the track "doesn't do justice for either [Lopez and Montana]," criticizing him for "run[ning] out of steam within the first 20 seconds of popping up on the track" and Jennifer for sound[ing] like she's trying too hard."

== Remix ==
A remix of the song featuring American rapper Big Sean was also premiered on March 6, 2014, a day after the original was released. On April 21, 2014, J Lo released a remix by DJ Khaled through her SoundCloud, featuring the original verses from French Montana and Big Sean in addition to a verse from Tyga.

== Music video ==
=== Background ===
A music video for "I Luh Ya Papi" was directed by Jessy Terrero in Miami, Florida. On February 12, 2014, Lopez was photographed on a large luxury yacht in Miami filming a music video. Lopez was clothed in a "skin-tight long-sleeve cut-out top" and "white hot pants", while wearing gold sunglasses and sporting a "sleek sectioned ponytail". She was surrounded by shirtless men. The clip for "I Luh Ya Papi" is a comic concept video that "speaks out about men objectifying women in 'every single video'". Speaking of the music video, Lopez stated: "The director came up with the concept to kind of flip the rap video — to make me the rapper and, you know, just turn the tables in that way...instead of having girls in bathing suits, have guys in bathing suits. Instead of having me be the soft girl in the video, be the rapper who's in the mansion and the yacht. It was all meant to be in good fun, but you know, I knew people would get the joke."

=== Synopsis ===
Lopez surrounded by semi-naked men during the music video, while also wearing a jumpsuit inspired by her famous Green Versace jungle dress.

The video opens with Lopez and two of her female friends consulting with a record label executive on treatment ideas for her new music video, who suggests that it be filmed in a water park or zoo. Her friends complain about females being objectified in music videos and begin fantasizing a concept video where Lopez objectifies males. Their fantasy video then begins with Lopez in a "morning-after scene", where she walks around a mansion filled with partly naked men ("for no reason"), wearing a tracksuit inspired by her famed 2000 Green Versace jungle dress. Then, Lopez and her friends (clothed in denim shorts) are seen dancing in a driveway, where they later view topless men cleaning cars. In a poolside scene, she and her friends are taking pictures of the men, and are fed by them. Later, Lopez is clothed in an all-white outfit on a yacht, where she and her friends continue objectifying the males. Towards the end of the clip, Lopez, French Montana and her friends all appear singing, rapping and dancing in a studio-lit setting.

=== Reception ===
Rosie Swash of The Guardian stated that "gender politics are confused but the outfits are fabulous". Lily Rothman of Time magazine similarly asked, "If she and her girlfriends are upset enough about women being objectified in music videos to make a whole video skewering that tradition, why respond by objectifying other people?." Rothman also noted the two female back-up dancers who act as "decorative objects" for French Montana's appearance in the clip, and wrote: "They don't play characters, they don't really show off any particular dance skills, you can barely see their faces — it's pretty much a textbook case of the "video vixen" objectification that's derided in the video's intro." The Huffington Post's Emma Gray commented that, "There is something simply wonderful about seeing a mainstream pop star – one who has been working within the confines of music industry sexism for decades – explicitly call out a gender-based double standard". However, Gray noted the video's "empowering undertones" to fall apart in French Montana's scene: "With the entrance of a powerful male character, the scripts are immediately flipped back to normal." Speaking of the video's theme, Daisy Buchanann of The Telegraph wrote: "I suspect she's savvy enough to know that full frontal feminism would lead to a commercial disaster, and she knows she can't fix sexism within the industry with one video, but she can start a conversation about it." Nadeska Alexis of MTV News praised the video's role reversal, praising Lopez for "actually waving a flag for women in the accompanying music video, as she should, since March is Women's History Month and all." Alexis called the clip "Basically 'Blurred Lines' For Women". The video racked up 9.5 million views on Vevo during its first week of release.

== Live performances ==
Lopez performed the song live on the March 20, 2014 episode of American Idol, where she is a part of the judging panel. The performance opened with an a cappella introduction that featured Lopez singing with former contestants of the show, Jessica Sanchez, Allison Iraheta and Pia Toscano. French Montana joined Lopez on stage towards the end of the performance. She wore a "skimpy" pair of denim cut-offs "paired with glittery tights and a furry parka", while being accessorized with "big earrings, white wedge sneakers and a tight bun". The stage, according to Idolator's Lisa Timmons, was a "throwback to the gritty fabulous Bronx in the '80s with Jennifer and a gang of fly girls". However, not all of the reception was positive; some fans accused Lopez of lip syncing the performance. The song was also on the setlist of Lopez's concert at Power 106's "Powerhouse 2014", on May 17, 2014, and at her Orchard Beach free concert, in the Bronx, on June 4, 2014. During the latter, she performed it in three-part harmony while sitting on a neighborhood stoop set with her backup singers, including, once again, Toscano.

== Charts ==
| Chart (2014) | Peak position |
|---|---|
| Australia Urban (ARIA) | 25 |
| Belgium Urban (Ultratop Flanders) | 32 |
| Canada Hot 100 (Billboard) | 78 |
| South Korea (Gaon International Digital Chart) | 59 |
| UK Singles (Official Charts Company) | 170 |
| UK Hip Hop/R&B (Official Charts) | 33 |
| US Billboard Hot 100 | 77 |
| US Dance Club Songs (Billboard) | 5 |
| US Rhythmic Airplay (Billboard) | 32 |

== Release history ==
| Country | Date | Format | Label |
|---|---|---|---|
| Canada | March 11, 2014 | Digital download | Universal |
| United States | March 11, 2014 | Digital download | Capitol |
| France | March 12, 2014 | Digital download | Universal |
| Germany | March 12, 2014 | Digital download | Universal |
| Italy | March 12, 2014 | Digital download | Universal |
| Japan | March 12, 2014 | Digital download | Universal |
| Spain | March 12, 2014 | Digital download | Universal |
| United Kingdom | March 12, 2014 | Digital download | Capitol UK |
