= Suzannah Weiss =

American journalist

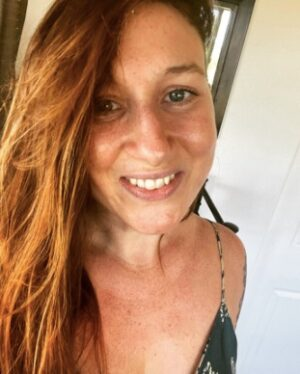
- Born: September 6, 1990 (age 36)
- Education: Brown University, University of Minnesota, Antioch University
- Occupation: Writer
- Writing career
- Language: English
- Genres: Feminism, sex, relationships
- Website: www.suzannahweiss.com

Suzannah Weiss (born September 6, 1990) is an American writer and sexologist. She is the author of Subjectified: Becoming a Sexual Subject (Polity, 2024), which details her journey toward sexual empowerment and a framework for moving beyond the objectification of women, and Eve's Blessing: Uncovering the Lost Pleasure Behind Female Pain (Polity, 2025), which challenges the normalization of women's pain and paves a path toward more pleasurable lives for women. She has written for publications including The New York Times, The Washington Post, and New York Magazine and edited for Teen Vogue, Complex, and Vice.

Weiss is also a sex therapist, a sexual assault counselor, a birth doula, and a sex educator certified by the American Association of Sexuality Educators, Counselors, and Therapists (AASECT). She is the resident sexologist at Erojoy, a wellness company that develops technology-driven sex toys.

Weiss has taught a variety of sexuality courses and spoken at conferences including South by Southwest, the AASECT Conference, and the Woodhull Freedom Foundation's Sexual Freedom Summit. She has been quoted as an expert in publications such as Cosmopolitan, Men's Health, CNN, Glamour, and Teen Vogue and played a central role in social media discussions of how women are treated by doctors. Her writing has been published in several anthologies and has been discussed on The Today Show and The View. Her book Eve’s Blessing: Uncovering the Lost Pleasure Behind Female Pain received the AASECT Amplifying Voices book award for General Audience in 2026. She has appeared on Bold TV, C-SPAN, The Fallen State, and many radio shows and podcasts.

== Philosophy ==
Weiss questions the idea that women's power is primarily located in their appearance and that sex functions as a gift granted to men for male pleasure. Instead, she advocates for an approach that centers women's desire. Her book Subjectified maintains that repeated exposure to the male gaze—including in media marketed to women—can result in self-objectification. Weiss suggests that objectification often becomes intertwined with girlhood and womanhood. Weiss promotes sexual empowerment and has encouraged individuals to communicate their desires and boundaries and respect one another's autonomy.

Her book Eve's Blessing argues that the cultural normalization of women's pain has roots in patriarchal systems that historically treated women as property and continue to inform medical institutions today. She contends that the expectation of suffering during menstruation, childbirth, and first-time sex stems from misinterpretations of religious texts rather than Biblical truth, using the curse of Eve as an example of a mistranslation used to justify dismissing women's pains and health concerns. Weiss is critical of healthcare providers who fail to treat women as sexual beings, citing the routine neglect of sexual side effects when prescribing medications such as birth control and the dismissal of female sexual dysfunctions that could be indicative of major health problems, especially in older age. Ultimately, Weiss argues that womanhood should be defined not by the endurance of pain, but the capacity for pleasure.

== Education ==
Weiss is a feminist. She holds a Master of Arts in clinical psychology from Antioch University, a Master of Professional Studies in sexual health from the University of Minnesota, a Bachelor of Science in cognitive neuroscience from Brown University, and a Bachelor of Arts in gender and sexuality studies and modern culture and media from Brown University.

== Erotic content and performance art ==
Weiss works as an erotic performance artist and model under the stage names Shoshanna Blanca and Jesus Christ Pornstar. In her book Subjectified, she details her decision to engage in online sex work, describing an initial hesitation rooted in concerns about objectification before experiencing what she calls an "epiphany" regarding the liberatory potential of pleasure as work. She has described her OnlyFans as an "art gallery" providing a visual companion to her writing.

Her primary performance art project The Second Coming blends Christian and Jewish imagery and concepts with erotic content to make "sexuality sacred" and redefine purity. She explores themes of divinity, sexual shame, and body autonomy through body art, music, prayer, educational vlogs, and sensual performances. A companion project, Uncovering Eve, presents images, Bible verses, and videos reinterpreting the Biblical story of Adam and Eve through a feminist lens, serving as a visual extension of her award-winning book Eve's Blessing. Weiss has described her performance work as an extension of her advocacy and academic views on sexual shame, purity culture, and the destigmatization of sex work.
