= Same Girl (Jennifer Lopez song) =

Promotional single by Jennifer Lopez

from the album A.K.A.
- Released: February 4, 2014
- Recorded: March 2013
- Studio: Conway (Los Angeles); Doppler Studios (Atlanta); Monk Music (Hamptons); Pinky's Palace (Hidden Hills)
- Genre: R&B
- Length: 3:30
- Label: Capitol
- Songwriters: Chris Brown; Antwan "Amadeus" Thompson; Charles "Chizzy" Stephens III; Ryan "Ryghtous" Tedder; Jennifer Lopez
- Producers: Amadeus; Chizzy; Ryghtous Ryan

Music video
- "Same Girl" on YouTube

"Same Girl" is a song recorded by American entertainer Jennifer Lopez for her eighth studio album, A.K.A. (2014). The song was written by Lopez and Chris Brown in collaboration with the song's producers Antwan "Amadeus" Thompson, Charles "Chizzy" Stephens, and Ryan "Ryghtous" Tedder, while Cory Rooney handled vocal production of the song. A solo version of "Same Girl" was released on February 4, 2014, as the second promotional single from A.K.A.. An accompanying music video for the solo version of the song was directed by Steve Gomillion and Dennis Leupold in the Castle Hill neighborhood of The Bronx, Lopez's hometown. This video embodies Lopez in the Bronx with its residents, among them are children, rappers, prostitutes, dancers who are living in South Bronx. "Same Girl" was remixed to feature fellow Bronx artist and rapper French Montana for its inclusion on the album. In 2022 a new orchestral version of the song was released in support of Lopez's Netflix documentary Halftime.

== Background ==
Lopez tweeted a picture of herself on March 21, 2013 in the recording studio with her long-time collaborator Cory Rooney and American singer Chris Brown. Lopez captioned the picture with the hashtag "#SAMEGIRL", leading some to believe that it was either a song title or the name of Lopez's upcoming eighth studio album. Several days later, Brown described their collaborations as being "fun stuff" and "party music". In April, Lopez commented that she and Brown were "in the studio, writing songs and just getting that whole 'Jenny from the Block' flavor back". She also revealed that they "worked on a bunch of ideas" and that they had discussed the possibility of recording a duet for Brown's upcoming sixth studio album, X (2014). In September 2013, Brown revealed the titles of two songs that he had written for Lopez: "Emotions" and "Same Girl".

On January 13, 2014, during her appearance on The Tonight Show, Lopez shared a 45-second preview of "Same Girl" and its music video. Two days later, Lopez revealed that the snippet was "just something [she] was doing for the fans" and that the song was not the first single from her upcoming album, despite some speculation and media reporting that it would be. "Same Girl" is the second promotional single from A.K.A., after Lopez released the DJ Mustard-produced song "Girls" on January 22, 2014. Like its successor, "Girls" was remixed to feature a rapper for its inclusion on the album; the album version of "Girls" features rapper Tyga.

== Writing and production ==
"Same Girl" was written by Lopez and Brown in collaboration with the song's producers Antwan "Amadeus" Thompson, Charles "Chizzy" Stephens and Ryan "Ryghtous" Tedder. It is a R&B song, with "J. Lo"'s self-assured vocal performance, triumphant brass, vocal samples and trap-tinged hi-hat rolls. The song runs for a duration of three minutes and thirty seconds (3:30).

Lopez's vocals were recorded by Michael Glines and Patrick Doyle at Pink's Palace in Hidden Hills, California, with further recorded by Trevor Muzzy at Los Angeles' Conway Recording Studios and Cynthia Daniels at Monk Music Hamptons, New York. Max Unruh recorded French Montana's vocals in Atlanta, Georgia at Doppler Studios. He appears courtesy of Bad Boy. Longtime Lopez collaborator Cory Rooney was responsible for overall production while audio mixing was carried out by Jaycen Joshua's The Penna Project at Larrabee Sound Studios in North Hollywood, California with assistance from Ryan Kaul.

According to Lopez, the song is about "getting back to your roots and remembering where you're from", returning to the themes of 2002 hit "Jenny from the Block". "Cause I'm on the same grind, no I never changed, I'm loving everyday, I know that I'm the same Jenny from around the way now," Lopez sings. In 2022, an orchestral version of the song titled "Same Girl" (Halftime Remix) was released in promotion of her Netflix's documentary Jennifer Lopez: Halftime which documents Lopez's preparations for her performance at the Super Bowl LIV halftime show (2020) and the film Hustlers (2019).

== Music video ==
"I had this idea like, oh, when I do the video for [Same Girl], if I ever do a video for this, I'm gonna go back to my old neighbourhood in the Bronx (...) I'm gonna go back to Castle Hill, I'm gonna get on the train from Manhattan, I'm just gonna film the whole thing. So we did!"

—Lopez on filming the music video for "Same Girl".

The music video for "Same Girl" was shot guerrilla style in the Castle Hill neighborhood of The Bronx, Lopez's hometown, during the weekend of December 28, 2013. It was directed by Steve Gomillion and Dennis Leupold, who have worked previously with Lopez on a variety of projects. The music video was described by Jocelyn Vena of MTV News as a "love letter" to the singer's hometown. The clip features Lopez taking on the subway, singing on a rooftop, a brothel, a strip club, a dance club and a market. Walking throughout her neighborhood while greeting locals, taking pictures with fans and dancing. In the video, it's about the fact that the Bronx is a diverse neighborhood with beautiful people at heart and that it doesn't matter who you are. The South Bronx is special. And those who live there are also special people. Among them are most often dancers, gangsters, sex workers, lgbtq people, but also people who own small grocery businesses or others.

The video ends with a note from Lopez that reads: "Thank you Andrew Freedman House, Jazz at Lincoln Center Youth Orchestra, and to all my people in the Bronx... You're forever in my heart."

On the music video, Lopez said: "This was probably the craziest thing I've done in my career of music and movies. I like just being able to do things spontaneously, and not have everything so planned out." Recalling her decision to travel back to the Bronx and ride the subway for the music video, Lopez stated during an interview with Jay Leno: "Life can be so complicated and complex for everybody and for me as well and I just felt like, I just wanna get back on the train [...] It really just reminded me of all those amazing memories of riding on that train back and forth to Manhattan and back to the Bronx."

== Track listing ==
Digital promotional single

1. "Same Girl" - 3:30

Album track download/stream

1. "Same Girl" (featuring French Montana) - 4:06

Halftime Remix

1. "Same Girl" (featuring French Montana; Halftime Remix) – 4:20

== Credits and personnel ==
Adapted from album booklet.

=== Recording locations ===
- Pink's Palace (Hidden Hills, California)
- Conway Recording Studios (Los Angeles, California)
- Monk Music Studios (Hamptons, New York)
- Doppler Studios (Atlanta, Georgia) (French Montana's vocals, album version only)
- Mixing: The Penna Project at Larrabee Sound Studios (North Hollywood, California)

=== Personnel ===
- Jennifer Lopez - lead vocals, songwriter
- French Montana - featured vocals (album version only)
- Chris Brown - songwriter
- Cynthia Daniels - additional vocal recording
- Patrick Doyle - vocal recording
- Michael Glines - vocal recording
- Jaycen Joshua - audio mixing
- Ryan Kaul - assistant mixing engineer
- Trevor Muzzy - additional vocal recording
- Cory Rooney - vocal production
- Charles "Chizzy" Stephens III - songwriter, producer
- Ryan M. "Ryghtous" Tedder - songwriter, producer
- Antwan "Amadeus" Thompson - songwriter, producer
- Max Unruh - vocal recording (French Montana's vocals, album version only)

== Charts ==
Chart (2014)	Peak position
South Korea (Gaon International Digital Chart)	31

== Release history ==
Release history and formats for "Same Girl"
Country	Date	Format	Version	Label	Ref.
France	February 4, 2014	Digital download; streaming	Solo version	Capitol Music France	
Germany	February 4, 2014	Digital download; streaming	Solo version	EMI Music	
Italy	February 4, 2014	Digital download; streaming	Solo version	EMI Music	
United Kingdom	February 4, 2014	Digital download; streaming	Solo version	Virgin EMI	
United States	February 4, 2014	Digital download; streaming	Solo version	Capitol Records	
Spain	February 4, 2014	Digital download; streaming	Solo version	EMI Music	
Germany	June 13, 2014	Digital download; streaming	Album version; featuring French Montana	EMI Music	
Netherlands	June 13, 2014	Digital download; streaming	Album version; featuring French Montana	EMI Music	
United Kingdom	June 16, 2014	Digital download; streaming	Album version; featuring French Montana	Virgin EMI	
Various	June 16, 2022	Digital download; streaming	Halftime version	Epic Records	
