= Girls (Jennifer Lopez song) =

Promotional single by Jennifer Lopez (featuring Tyga on the remix)

from the album A.K.A.
- Released: January 22, 2014
- Recorded: January 2014
- Studio: Encore Recording Studios (Burbank, CA); Conway Recording Studios (Los Angeles, CA); Doppler Studios (Atlanta, GA)
- Genre: Hip hop; R&B
- Length: 3:58 (solo version); 4:40 (remix / album version)
- Label: Capitol
- Songwriters: Asia Bryant; Jennifer Lopez; Dijon "DJ Mustard" McFarlane; Tyga (remix only)
- Producer: DJ Mustard

Audio video
- "Girls" on YouTube

"Girls" is a song by American singer Jennifer Lopez from her eighth studio album, A.K.A. (2014). The composition is characterized as a midtempo R&B and hip hop club song that serves as an ode to women's desires in wanting to indulge themselves in a quintessentially jovial girl's night out experience by going out for a night at the club, reveling in the joy of partying in addition to partaking in the concomitant celebratory act of having a good time. The song was written by Lopez along with Asia Bryant and Dijon "DJ Mustard" McFarlane. The latter produced the song and vocals, with further vocal production from Bryan, Cory Rooney and Trevor Muzzy. The song was released as a promotional single by Capitol Records in countdown to the album on January 22, 2014. On March 1, an official remix featuring American rapper Tyga was released for digital download; the remix with him is featured on the Japanese and Target releases of A.K.A, whilst the solo version is omitted from all versions of the album.

"Girls" received a mixed reception from music critics who praised the urban and commercially radio-friendly production, drawing comparisons to Beyoncé's "Single Ladies (Put a Ring on It)" (2008) and Kelly Rowland's 2011 single "Motivation", but was criticized for its cliché and prosaic lyrical content. The song's live performance at the Dubai World Cup was met by a positive reception with critics who praised Lopez's energy skills as an entertainer. Commercially, experienced limited success on music charts, only charting in South Korea where it reached number 73 on the Gaon international chart. Lopez has included "Girls" as part of her Las Vegas residency, All I Have (2016–18) and North America tour It's My Party (2019).

== Background and composition ==
"Girls" was first was released as a teaser on January 20, 2014, when record producer DJ Mustard messaged Lopez on Twitter stating that he had "some bangers waiting for her". Lopez would go on to record the song and release the promotional single online on January 22, 2014. "Girls" was written by Lopez and Bryant, with additional writing from DJ Mustard, who also handled the majority of the production; Bryant, Cory Rooney and Trevor Muzzy handled vocal production. It has a duration of three minutes and 58 seconds (3:58) and is a mid-tempo hip hop and R&B club track that features a "laid-back" and "trunk-rattling" beat, characterized by a harmonious blend of melodious bells that serve as its main groove juxtaposed against an accompaniment of recurring arrangement of eerie synthesizers, crisp dance claps while being complemented by a resonating bassline of pulsating 808 kick drums in which Lopez declares "At the end of the night, girls just wanna have fun." Rap-Up described "Girls" as a "ladies anthem", while Vibe called it a "club banger". Jon Reyes of The Boombox regarded the song as including DJ Mustard's signature "ratchet" sound. ETonline's Jackie Willis said that the song was reminiscent of Beyoncé's "Single Ladies (Put a Ring On It)" (2008).

== Release and reception ==
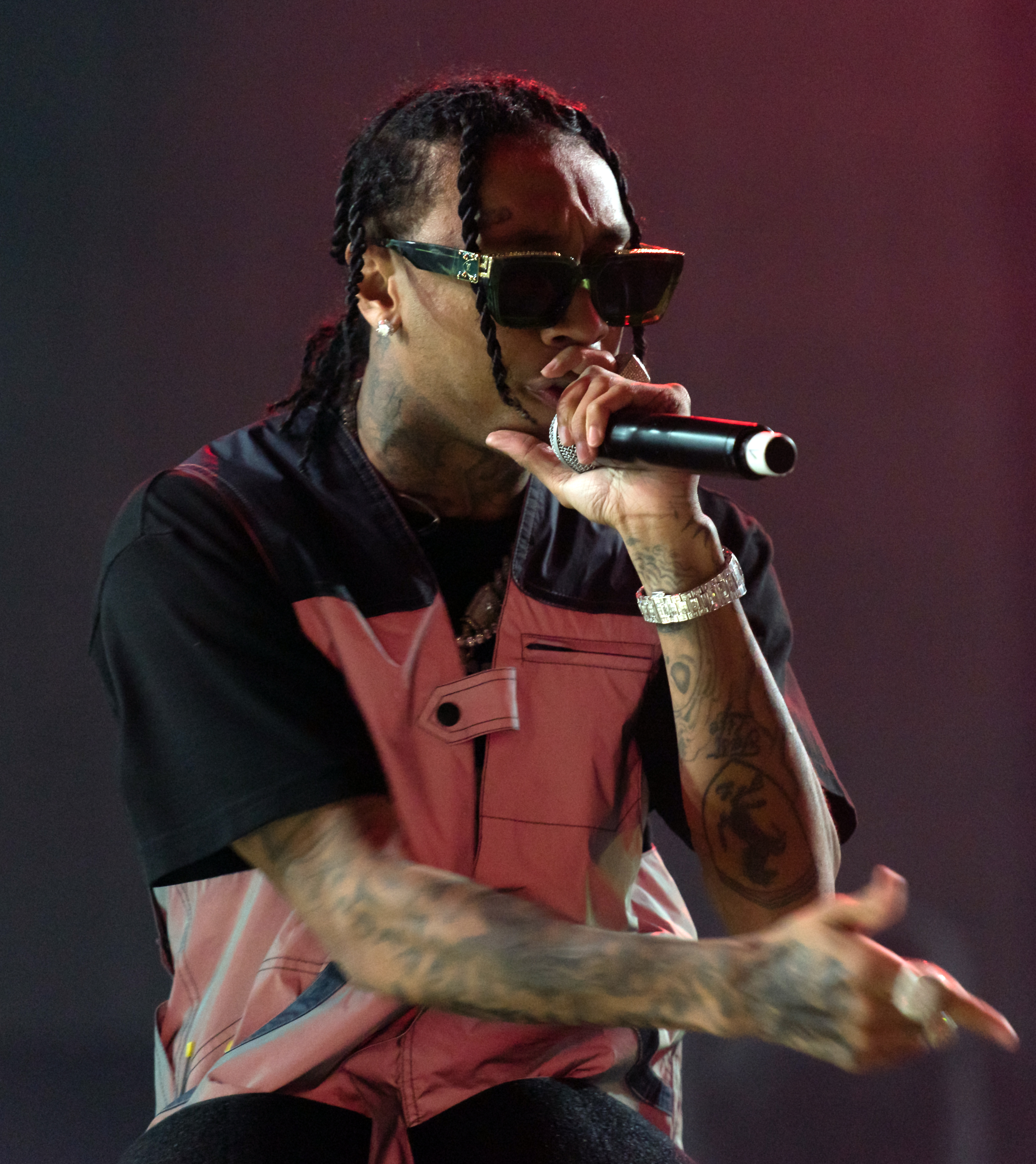
American rapper Tyga features on the official remix and album versions of "Girls".

On January 22, 2014, "Girls" was premiered online, via SoundCloud. On January 27, 2014, the song was made available for purchase as a digital download in Canada and the United States. "Girls" was later released for digital download in various other countries on January 30 of that year. An official remix of the song, featuring rapper Tyga, was released online on March 1, 2014. By the time A.K.A was released, "Girls" was omitted from the tracklisting apart from for the Japan and Target releases of the album where the Tyga remix of "Girls" is included a bonus track.

"Girls" was met with a mixed reception from music critics, with praise for the production and return to an urban sound but some criticism of the lyrics. In writing for Popdust, Jacques Peterson of the website Popdust called the song a "real bop", comparing it to Tyga's single "Rack City" (2011) and songs from Cassie Ventura's mixtape RockaByeBaby (2013). Peterson said "it's definitely the most urban thing Jen's done" since her remix album J to tha L-O! The Remixes (2002). Staff from Rap-Up, said upon the release of "Girls", women would "turn it all the way up." In a mixed review, Idolator's Robbie Daw criticized the song's clichéd lyrics, but praised its "eerie synth track that plays monotonously throughout", describing the track as a "slinky, sexy slow jam" similar to Kelly Rowland's "Motivation" (2011). Brad O'Mance of Popjustice was negative when commenting on the song, calling it "largely mediocre". Commercially, the song had limited success, only charting in South Korea, where it reached number 73 on the International Download Chart.

== Live performances ==
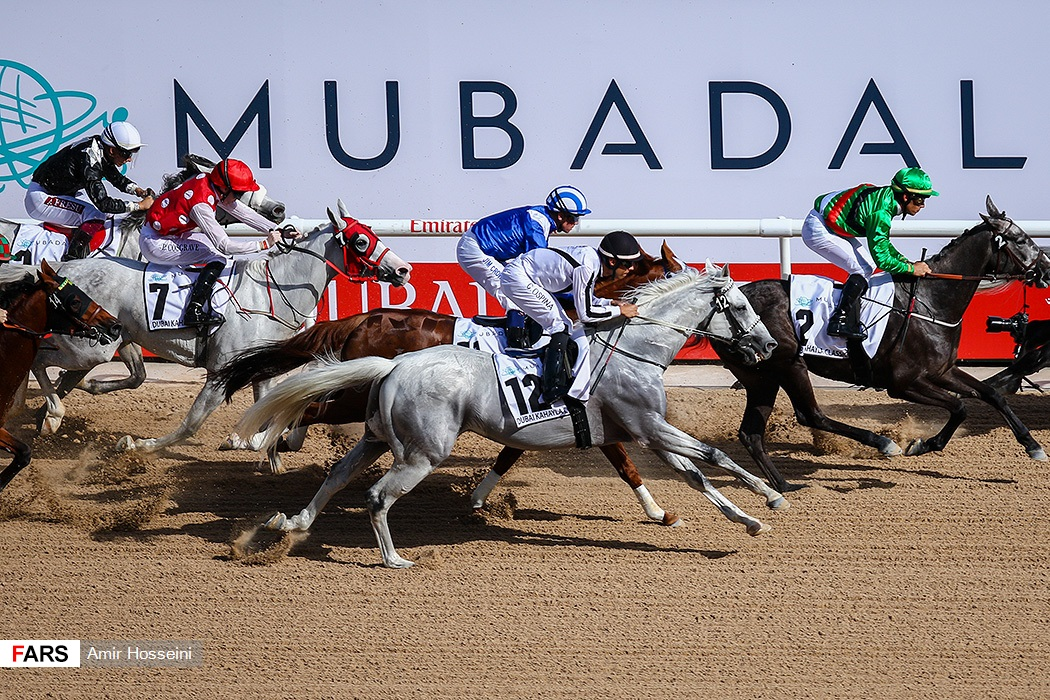
Lopez's performance in Dubai was part of the Dubai World Cup, the world's most expensive horse racing event.

Lopez performed the song live at the 2014 Dubai World Cup, on March 29, 2014 as part of a 30 minute set. The performance was billed as part of a post-race celebration to bring to an end the Dubai World Cup Carnival which had been going on for the previous three months. It was also Lopez's second time performing in Dubai having previously staged a concert in November 2012 as part of the Dance Again World Tour. During the set, Lopez also performed another new song from A.K.A, titled "Never Satisfied".

Marwa Hammad reporting for the Gulf News, praised the performance, saying that "it’s a testament to how good an entertainer Jennifer Lopez is that you can be far, far away from the stage and still be completely swept away by her show." Similarly The National's Felicity Campbell reported that Lopez "stormed the Medyan Racecourse stage". "Girls" was included in performances during Lopez's Las Vegas residency, All I Have (2016–2018) and the setlist for Lopez's 2019 concert tour, It's My Party.

== Track listings ==
Digital download/streaming

1. "Girls" – 3:58

Streaming/Album track – Remix

1. "Girls" (featuring Tyga) – 4:40

== Personnel ==
Credits adapted from A.K.A. liner notes.

- Asia Bryant – vocal production, composer
- Jaycen Joshua – mixing
- Ryan Kaul – (assistant) mixing
- Jennifer Lopez – vocals, composer
- Dijon "DJ Mustard" McFarlane – composer, producer
- Trevory Muzzy – engineer, vocal production
- Cory Rooney – vocal production
- Michael "Tyga" Stevenson – composer (remix only), rap remix vocals

== Charts ==
Chart (2014)	Peak position
South Korea (Gaon International Download Chart)	73

== Release history ==
Country	Date	Format	Version	Label	Ref.
Various	January 22, 2014	Streaming	Solo version	Capitol Records	
Canada	January 27, 2014	Digital download	Solo version	Capitol Records	
United States	January 27, 2014	Digital download	Solo version	Capitol Records	
France	January 30, 2014	Digital download	Solo version	EMI Music	
Germany	January 30, 2014	Digital download	Solo version	EMI Music	
Italy	January 30, 2014	Digital download	Solo version	EMI Music	
United Kingdom	January 30, 2014	Digital download	Solo version	EMI Music	
Spain	January 30, 2014	Digital download	Solo version	EMI Music	
Various	March 1, 2014	Streaming	Remix	Capitol Records	
