= A.K.A. (album) =

Studio album by Jennifer Lopez
- Released: June 13, 2014
- Recorded: February 2013 – April 28, 2014
- Studios: Conway Studios (Los Angeles); Doppler Studios (Atlanta); Encore Recording Studios (Burbank); Pinky's Palace (Hidden Hills); Roccstarr Studio (Woodland Hills); Westlake Recording Studios (Los Angeles); Wolf Cousins Studios (Stockholm)
- Genres: EDM; synth-pop
- Length: 36:16
- Labels: Capitol; Nuyorican
- Producers: A. Chal; DJ Mustard; Noel "Detail" Fisher; Ilya; Jennifer Lopez; Max Martin; Benny Medina; Pop & Oak; Cory Rooney; Harmony Samuels; Sham; Charles "Chizzy" Stephens; Jovan JR Taylor; Ryan "Ryghtous" Tedder; TheAceFace69; Leon "Roccstar" Youngblood

Jennifer Lopez chronology
Dance Again... the Hits (2012)	A.K.A. (2014)	Marry Me (2022)

Singles from A.K.A.
- 1. "I Luh Ya Papi" Released: March 11, 2014; 2. "First Love" Released: May 1, 2014; 3. "Booty" Released: September 23, 2014

A.K.A. (an acronym for Also Known As) is the eighth studio album by American singer Jennifer Lopez. It was released on June 13, 2014, by Capitol Records and was her only release on the label. Lopez started working on the album in February 2013, after the end of her first worldwide tour, the Dance Again World Tour. Originally scheduled to be released in November 2013, Lopez postponed the album release to 2014. Undecided between Same Girl and A.K.A. as the album's title, Lopez eventually chose the latter as the title.

Initially, A.K.A. was to be executively produced by RedOne, with the producer claiming the album was going to mix many styles, having a blend of her previous musical background: urban pop, dance-pop and Latin. However, Cory Rooney and Benny Medina, her longtime collaborators, later became the album's executive producers, along with herself, bringing a more pop, EDM and R&B sound to the album. In early 2014, Lopez released two urban-infused tracks as the album's promotional singles: "Girls" and "Same Girl". Besides frequent contributor and personal friend Pitbull, the album also features collaborations with French Montana, T.I., Iggy Azalea, Rick Ross, Nas, Jack Mizrahi and Tyga.

Upon its release, A.K.A. received generally mixed reviews from music critics, who spoke unfavorably of the album's mixed styles, although some songs were singled out for praise. Commercially, A.K.A. made minor impact on the charts, becoming one of her lowest-charting studio albums and becoming her lowest-selling album at the time, having sold 71,000 copies in 2014 in US. A.K.A. was preceded by the release of two singles, "I Luh Ya Papi" and "First Love", which both had minor impact on the charts, as well as a third single "Booty" which was remixed to feature Azalea. The latter would go on to become the most successful single from the album, peaking at number 18 on the US Billboard Hot 100 and becoming Lopez's most recent top 20 hit on the chart.

== Background ==
After the decision to publish the seventh studio album Love? with Island Records in 2010, Lopez said that she had to release a greatest hits album to fulfill her contractual agreement with Epic Records, her former label: "I owe a greatest hits [album] to the record company...or I can go ahead and start a new album. I just haven't decided yet." In 2012, following the release of the collaboration "Dance Again" with Pitbull and the track "Goin' In", which was featured on the soundtrack for the film Step Up Revolution, Lopez published her first greatest hits album Dance Again... the Hits. The release coincided with Lopez's first headlining world tour, the Dance Again World Tour which would last until the end of 2012.

Lopez subsequently left her position as judge on the reality television competition American Idol to focus on her tour and film career, a platform which had rejuvenated her career the previous year after a relatively unsuccessful period.

== Recording ==
"I really love the process of making an album, this one in particular because it took me so long. I came off tour last year, probably in January, and I got right back into the studio and I started working on it and I just took my time with it for the first time. Usually I do an album in a few months, but this one's taking me a year to really put together and little by little I've been letting little pieces of it out and now we're ready to let it go."

— Lopez on the process of recording the album.

In November 2012, RedOne confirmed that he was the executive producer of the album. He told MTV News: "We already have songs that are just incredible. It's just amazing. It's mixed [styles]. It's everything about Jennifer Lopez." He described the album as special, "It's not one thing; it's everything you experience [...] It's a very special album. It feels like this album, to us, has to have everything about her, not just one thing. You're going to have all the sides, kind of urban/hip-hop and the commercial, like the way she did with Ja Rule. It's everything you love about her [including] the dance, the rhythmic, the Latin." That December, Lopez confirmed that she was about to begin recording her eighth studio album after her Dance Again World Tour ended. The following month, Lopez told USA Today that her primary focus was films, however, she was slowly putting together her album, stating: "I'm never not working on music". During an interview with People, she revealed that she had written a song entitled "We Loved" about her break-up with husband Marc Anthony, that caused her to cry while recording. Briefly commenting on the type of music she was recording for the album, Lopez stated "I'm doing everything that I think people expect of me." In 2013 Jennifer Lopez signed a contract with RedOne's 2101 Records and Capitol Records.

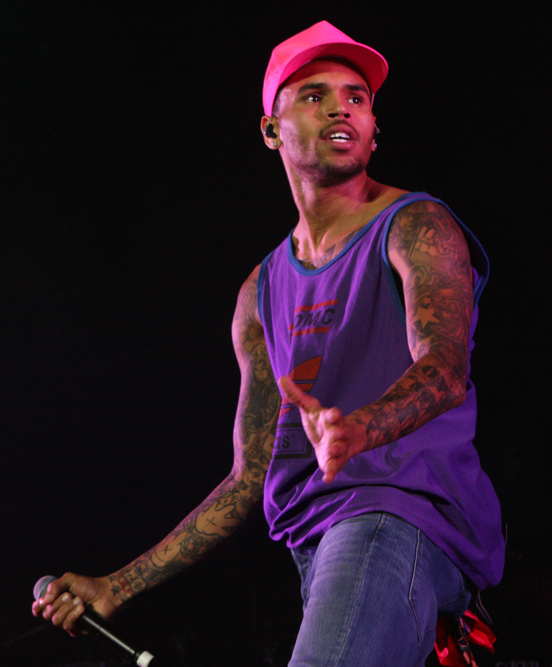
American singer Chris Brown co-wrote two tracks on A.K.A.

A.K.A. saw Lopez reunite with producer Cory Rooney, a long-time collaborator of hers whom she had not worked with since 2007. Other producers known to have worked with Lopez on the album are Da Internz and Max Martin. In late February 2013, Lopez began working with American rapper Future, who was confirmed to be featured and have production credits on the album. The next month, Lopez began working with Chris Brown, who said he was writing "fun stuff" and "party music" for her. Lopez commented that her collaboration with Brown would evoke the "flavor" of her signature hit "Jenny from the Block", and they would be "sonically time-traveling back to 2002 for this release". Of working with Brown, Lopez said, "We talked for a little while about just life and stuff and then he would just jump into the booth and start writing." In May 2013, RedOne revealed that the album was almost complete, and that it has "at least four or five bangers, incredible hits" on it. He further revealed that: "We're doing an album that has everything. She's an incredible A&R herself, so she loves music, she knows what she wants, and I'm just helping her to do that album."

By June 2013, Lopez stated that she had recorded up to 20 songs for the album. In August, it was revealed that she worked with producer Steve Mostyn and Australian singer-songwriter Sia on material for the album. Of working with Lopez, Sia stated "she can really SING!" and it was "super fun". In September, Lopez was pictured working in the studio with singer Robin Thicke and rapper Big Sean. Lopez spoke to Rap-Up about the collaboration with Thicke, saying that "[she] actually played him a couple of different songs so he could see what [she] was doing and he was really excited about it. He picked the song he wanted to do." The song entitled "Love Line" was produced by Da Internz. Thicke also suggested asking Wiz Khalifa to join the duo on the track. Lopez also recorded a duet with singer Maxwell, with whom she had wanted to work with for ten years. Neither song appeared on the final tracklist for the album. In January 2014, she returned to the studio, working with French Montana and DJ Mustard. During an interview with Vibe magazine, Lopez said that she originally asked Montana to feature on the song "Same Girl", but when she told Montana she was filming a video for another song called "I Luh Ya Papi" in the Bronx, he wanted to hear the song and subsequently recorded guest vocals for that song as well. In the same interview, Lopez had stated that she wanted to work with The-Dream and Tricky Stewart again, after working with them both previously on Love?; she managed to finish recording one song with Stewart for the new album. It was also confirmed that Australian artist Iggy Azalea features on one song on the album. Speaking about collaborating with Lopez, Azalea said "I definitely used to sit in my bedroom as a young girl and lip-sync Jennifer Lopez songs, so it's very cool to have a song with her on her album." Later in January, Lopez stated that the album was being finalized, and on April 28, the studio records were handed over for mastering, two days later than anticipated by the label.

== Music and lyrics ==
Speaking of the album's sound and lyricism, Lopez stated, "It's gonna be a different sound, I think a lot has happened to me in the past year or two, I've changed a little bit, my ideas about love has changed...you grow", referring to her divorce from singer Marc Anthony, which inspired lyrics for the album. However, she maintained that her topic is still love, "It's my motivation. It's what I think about. That's who I am at the essence." Speaking further about the album's concept, she said "if you listen to my albums, they were always about love. I've always sung about love. It was always love in a certain way: A fairytale type of way; I was hoping, praying, and wishing for that."

Musical genres explored on the album according to Lopez are R&B, hip hop, dance, pop, Latin, and funk. She said, "My roots are hip-hop, my roots are R&B, my roots are pop, my roots are Latin" and "This album is right back to that for me." Amaya Mendizabal of Billboard described the album as "An eclectic mix of sounds [...] as she opts for a mix of urban tilting songs, pop ballads, and dance inducing knockouts. Caroline Sullivan of The Guardian pointed out that "Lopez has moved on from the generic party bangers of her 2011 LP, Love?, veer[ing] from power balladry to squawking hip-hop to an EDM track. Sal Cinquemani of Slant Magazine agreed, writing that Lopez has switched hats, "this time from disco diva back to urban songstress." Jim Farber of New York Daily News noted that "There's a bit of dubstep (the title track), Latin pop, hip-hop ("Acting Like That"), R&B ("Worry No More") and even several ill-advised ballads.

== Songs ==
The album starts with "A.K.A.", a RoccStar-produced hip hop track that features rapper T.I. and was considered a "bass heavy banger". Lyrically, "A.K.A." is a declaration of self-identity and a presumed ex's inability to realize what they had before it was too late. "It took too long to find out what you want right now/ I'm too gone to stay around/ switching up my style," Lopez sings. The second track and second single "First Love" was produced by Max Martin and is an upbeat, bass-heavy track, in which Lopez sings: "I wish you were my first love, cuz if you were first, baby there would have been no second, third, or fourth love." Of the producer, she said: "Max Martin [is a] genius, man. He's a super producer, maker of great pop hits. I've always wanted to work with him but our paths [hadn't] crossed. I sought him out." The mid-tempo "Never Satisfied" was first premiered at a concert in Dubai and was considered a "guitar-driven" track. However, A.K.A.'s version is more R&B-infused, with hypnotic beats. "I'm never satisfied/ honey my appetite is keeping me up at night/ I'm going crazy for more of your love," Lopez pleads with a partner for everlasting affection. The album's first single and fourth track "I Luh Ya Papi" features French Montana and was named "an unashamed ode to sex", featuring "squeaky electronica and provocative rhetoric". The fifth track "Acting Like That" is a slow hip hop track with an urban groove, where Jennifer talks about a relationship on the rocks and warning of its demise. "Don't let the tables turn/ don't let the bridges burn/ been down for you don't get it confused/ boy you could lose your turn," she sings. The song features Australian rapper Iggy Azalea, who raps about "everything from Mary J. Blige to Lopez's 2001 hit 'Ain't It Funny'". The sixth track, the mid-tempo ballad "Emotions", was written by Chantal Kreviazuk and Chris Brown. Lopez passionately sings of anguish, guided by trickling keys: "Someone took my emotions, I feel good cuz I don't feel bad... I tried to give you all my love but that never meant a thing to you," she sings over squiggly synths and piano.

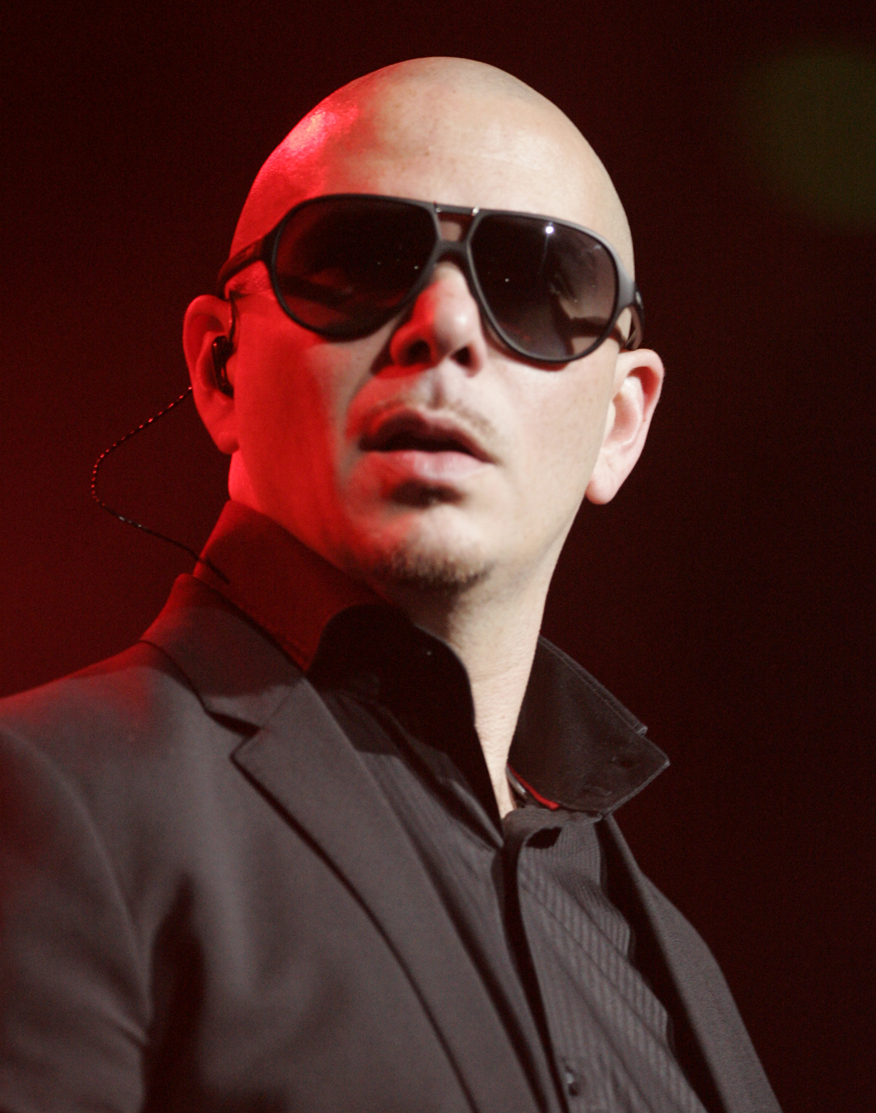
American rapper Pitbull is featured on "Booty", marking the sixth time he and Lopez collaborated.

The seventh track "So Good" looks back at a failed relationship, where Lopez sings about not needing the accompaniment of a man to endure: "I'm so done with pleasing you/ I'm so over needing you, all this space just gave me room so I could fly," she sings over mid-tempo electronic beats. "Let It Be Me" is a melancholic string-backed ballad, featuring Spanish guitar and passionate Latin sensibility. "When they ask who do you love, let it be me... let it be me that you think of," she pleads. The ninth track "Worry No More" features Rick Ross and was produced by Detail, being considered "the album's hardest hip-hop anthem". The "reverb-filled" down-tempo track has intelligible background whispers creeping in and out and vocal effects, adding a robotic element to it. "Do anything that you can to make me feel so protected/ I don't wanna worry no more," she sings on the chorus. The final track on the regular edition is the Diplo-produced track "Booty", which was co-written by Chris Brown and features longtime collaborator and personal friend Pitbull on their sixth collaboration. It is the only dance song on the album, with a quirky Middle Eastern vibe in the mix. "All the sexy girls in the party, go grab a man and bring him to the dancefloor", Lopez commands. Originally titled "Big Booty", Lopez first thought "Never in my life will I do a song called 'Big Booty'". Later, she listened to the demo in the car with her children, Emme and Max, and as soon as they heard the song they loved it and went crazy over it; being the main reason she gave it a second thought and chose to record the song and include it on the album.

The album's deluxe edition features four tracks. "Tens", a dancehall track, is the first, with Lopez ordering "Clap bitches, clap bitches", over outrageous synths before dropping commands like: "Eat the runway, serve the runway!" The track is an homage to the voguing / ballroom scene, as portrayed in the 1990 film documentary Paris Is Burning. During the track Lopez, along with ballroom MC Jack Mizrahi, shouts out the names of various ball categories and houses. "Troubeaux" follows, featuring Nas sampled Tom Scott and the California Dreamers's song "Today". Lyrically, on "Troubeaux", Lopez recognizes the impending complications of a troublesome romance. "The funny thing about you," she starts, "You got me doing things I wouldn't do/ you ain't no ordinary boy." "Expertease (Ready Set Go)" was co-written by Sia and was named "a sexy mid-tempo bop with a soaring chorus and double entendre-filled lyrics" about showing her partner what she's good at, offering a sassy play on words: "Let me show my expertise/ I'm an expert tease." The closing track on the deluxe edition, "Same Girl", was previewed early in 2014, with a music video being filmed in the Bronx. The song starts with an orchestral string section and, differently from the early version, the album's version once again features French Montana.

== Release and title ==
On January 1, 2013, Lopez announced on Twitter that her eighth studio album would be released sometime during the year, serving as the follow-up to her seventh studio album Love? (2011). However, the album was later scheduled for November, with the singer adding, "I think we're going to release this first [the single 'Live It Up'] and then a few singles and then we'll decide when to put the album out. The way the industry is going... I'm more a believer of letting it gain momentum. Let there be demand for the album by putting out some great music first." In March 2014, Lopez stated that she had to turn in the album on March 17. She said, "It feels like it's my first album all over again, because it is the tenth album and it is a special one for me." Ultimately, the singer revealed that the album would be released on June 17, 2014, explaining, "We're in the final stages of putting it together."

When asked about the title for the record, Lopez also said that she would wait "until the last minute" to decide. Finally, on April 29, 2014, Lopez revealed that she was considering two titles for the album, Same Girl and AKA. Speaking of the titles, she said "I feel like I've been given so many monikers, and I do a lot of different things." The artwork sees Lopez staring into the camera, dressed in a red leather skirt.

== Singles ==
On March 5, 2014, Lopez premiered the track "I Luh Ya Papi" featuring French Montana as the album's first single. Two additional versions of the song were made, featuring verses from Big Sean and Tyga. Lopez filmed the music video for "I Luh Ya Papi" in Miami, with Jessy Terrero serving as director. The song received positive reception from music critics, who despite calling the title "ridiculous", praised the track for being a fun, summer-anthem, also commending the hook and the "catchy" chorus. In spite of the positive reception, "I Luh Ya Papi" performed very moderate on the charts; its peak position was number 77 on the US Billboard Hot 100 and number 78 on the Canadian Hot 100 chart.

On May 1, 2014, Lopez released "First Love" as the album's second single. The song received positive reception from most critics, who praised its nostalgic feeling, calling it an enjoyable candy pop track. Its black-and-white music video, directed by Anthony Mandler, was released on May 29, 2014, and features British model David Gandy with Lopez in sexy scenes in the Mojave Desert. Even with the good reception, "First Love" debuted at number 87 on the Billboard Hot 100, although it charted well on the Pop Songs (at number 22), while it only reached number 63 on the UK Singles Chart and number 79 on the Irish Singles Chart.

"Booty" was officially remixed with vocals from Australian rapper Iggy Azalea, replacing those of Pitbull. The song was released on September 23, 2014, for digital download as the third single from the album. For the week of September 24, 2014, "Booty" debuted on the Billboard Hot 100 at number 18, becoming the second highest debut of her career (behind only "On the Floor", which started at number nine in 2011). "Booty" also marked the highest-charting Hot 100 entry from A.K.A. and her best single on the charts since 2012's "Dance Again", which peaked at number 17.

== Promotion ==
In January 2014, the songs "Same Girl" and "Girls" were released online as promotional singles. A music video for "Same Girl" was shot guerrilla-style in the Castle Hill neighborhood of the Bronx, Lopez's hometown. It was directed by Steve Gomillion and Dennis Leupold. Lopez performed the album's lead single "I Luh Ya Papi" live on the March 20, 2014, episode of American Idol, on which she was part of the judging panel. The performance opened with an a cappella introduction that featured Lopez singing with former contestants of the show, Jessica Sanchez, Allison Iraheta and Pia Toscano. French Montana joined Lopez on stage towards the end of the performance. Lopez performed second single "First Love" live for the first time at the 2014 Billboard Music Awards, where she also received the Icon Award. In support of the album, Lopez embarked on a six-date tour. She performed at the Xfinity Center in Mansfield, Massachusetts on May 30 and 31, at the New York City Neighborhood Sessions at State Farm on June 4, and then two appearances on The Tonight Show with Jimmy Fallon on June 16, 2014, and Good Morning America on June 20, 2014.

== Critical reception ==
Professional ratings
Aggregate scores
Source	Rating
Metacritic	45/100
Review scores
Source	Rating
AllMusic	3/5 stars
Billboard	4/5 stars
Entertainment Weekly	D
The Guardian	3/5 stars
New York Daily News	2/5 stars
The Observer	2/5 stars
Rolling Stone	2/5 stars
Slant Magazine	3/5 stars
Spin	5/10
USA Today	2.5/4 stars

A.K.A. received generally mixed reviews from contemporary music critics. At Metacritic, which assigns a normalized rating out of 100 to reviews from mainstream critics, the album received an average score of 45, based on ten reviews, which indicates "mixed or average reviews".

Stephen Thomas Erlewine of AllMusic gave the album a lukewarm review, commenting how the production is "burying her in their thrum". Writing for The Boston Globe, Sarah Rodman gave the record a mixed review, stating that the "opening handful of songs have a satisfying boom bap and hooks aplenty", but criticized the ballads. At The Observer, Phil Mongredien had a mixed impression of the material because it contains "forgettable EDM-by-numbers floor-fillers jostling with marginally more inspired ballads." Melissa Maerz of Entertainment Weekly wrote a scathingly negative review in remarking how Lopez is "working with hitmakers like Max Martin and Chris Brown, they just whip their synth-pop into a weightless foam that would disintegrate if you blew it a kiss", whilst also criticizing the lyricism as "lazy". At The Guardian, Kitty Empire gave a mixed impression review of the album in pronouncing the only problem is that "There are so many production cooks (and the ubiquitous Pitbull) that the broth is a bit characterless at times."

At Spin, Anupa Mistry's review was mixed, writing how Lopez issued another rote release deficient in any innovative aspects to make it appealing, which leaves the music feeling "simultaneously calculated and sloppy". Jim Farber of the New York Daily News was negative, stating that the album "finds J.Lo throwing anything she can at the wall to see what sticks." At Slant Magazine, Alexa Camp opined that "Unfortunately, A.K.A. also includes a slew of midtempo ballads whose soaring hooks and slick production are wasted on Lopez's reedy voice". Nick Murray of Rolling Stone noted that Lopez "sounds lost" on the album. In a more favorable review, Amaya Mendizabal of Billboard remarked that album contains "hits and misses", whilst it "journeys through some predictable refrains with a handful of prospective triumphs". Martin Caballero of USA Today called it an "eclectic album", yet suggests that the "results are mixed, with polished production obscuring some uneven songwriting". Adelle Platon of Vibe gave the album a positive review, stating, "A.K.A. can be treated like one of J. Lo's rom-coms: You feel guilty for enjoying it but then realize that the soundtrack to her life eventually becomes yours." At Newsday, Glenn Gamboa grading the album a B− commented, "The quality swings of A.K.A. make you wonder if J. Lo knows who she's trying to be."

== Commercial performance ==
In the United States, A.K.A. debuted at number 8 on the Billboard 200, with 33,000 copies sold in its first week, becoming the lowest sales debut of any of her studio albums. In the United Kingdom A.K.A. only reached number 41, becoming the lowest-charting album of her career to date. In its first week of sales, A.K.A. sold 2,060 copies; by comparison, her last studio album, Love?, debuted and peaked at number six (with 15,931 copies sold in its first week) in 2011, while subsequent compilation Dance Again... The Hits opened and peaked at number four (with initial sales of 9,213) in 2012. It also reached the low-regions of the Netherlands, where it debuted at number 39, becoming her lowest-charting album there. In Switzerland, A.K.A. experienced a top-twenty debut, at number 15; although it was her only studio album to not debut inside the top ten.

The album's recording failure in terms of sales was considered by numerous websites and media outlets to be one of the biggest flops in Jennifer Lopez's career. Regarding the lackluster sales of A.K.A, Jason Lipshutz of Billboard commented on the fact that the album proved that Lopez was "trapped in a different era". He claimed that "the 33,000-copy sales debut of A.K.A. represents a crossroads moment for a superstar who's about to turn 45. Lopez is right when she says that she doesn't have anything more to prove, but her sound needs to develop alongside the rest of her professional life." He did note that "throughout her career, Lopez's greatest strengths have been dancing and churning out dance music. However, the ballads on A.K.A. hint at a sweeping musical direction that Lopez has typically relegated to the back of her albums, as a supplement to her uptempo spectacles. Perhaps it's time to move it front and center." In a 2014 end-year Billboard albums analysis, A.K.A was selected as a flop album of the year, reporting that "while past J.Lo albums have debuted at lower chart positions, the first-week tally for A.K.A. is still embarrassing" in comparison to "plenty of publicity" commissioned by the record company.

== Track listing ==
A.K.A – standard edition
No.	Title	Writer(s)	Producer(s)	Length
1.	"A.K.A." (featuring T.I.)	Leon "Roccstar" Youngblood; Steven Franks; Terence Coles; Trevion Stokes; Mark Pitts; Kristina Marie Stephens; Clifford Joseph Harris, Jr.; Jennifer Lopez	Youngblood; Franks^{[a]}	3:48
2.	"First Love"	Max Martin; Savan Kotecha; Ilya Salmanzadeh	Martin; Ilya; Peter Carlsson^{[b]}	3:35
3.	"Never Satisfied"	Alejandro Salazar; Ilsey Juber; Lopez	A. Chal; Cory Rooney^{[b]}; Trevor Muzzy^{[b]}	3:13
4.	"I Luh Ya Papi" (featuring French Montana)	Noel "Detail" Fisher; Andre Proctor; Karim Kharbouch; Lopez	Fisher; Rooney^{[b]}	3:27
5.	"Acting Like That" (featuring Iggy Azalea)	Youngblood; Yoni "Soundtrack" Ayal; Coles; James "J-Doe" Smith; Pitts; K. Stephens; Amelia Amethyst Kelly; Lopez	Youngblood; Ayal^{[a]}; Rooney^{[b]}; Muzzy^{[b]}	3:17
6.	"Emotions"	Chris Brown; Chantal Kreviazuk; Shama Joseph; Rooney; Lopez	Sham; Rooney	4:13
7.	"So Good"	Youngblood; Ayal; Taylor Parks; Yacoub Kasawa; Pitts; K. Stephens; Lopez	Youngblood; Ayal^{[a]}	3:45
8.	"Let It Be Me"	Harmony Samuels; Kirby Lauryen; Lopez	Samuels; Rooney^{[b]}	3:46
9.	"Worry No More" (featuring Rick Ross)	Fisher; Jake Troth; William Leonard Roberts II; Lopez	Fisher	3:49
10.	"Booty" (featuring Pitbull)	Rooney; Lopez; Benny Medina; Brown; Asia Bryant; Armando Pérez; Thomas Wesley Pentz; Lewis D. Gittus; Tedra Renee Wilson; Danny Omerhodic	Rooney; Lopez; Medina	3:23
Total length:				36:16

A.K.A – deluxe edition bonus tracks
No.	Title	Writer(s)	Producer(s)	Length
11.	"Tens" (featuring Jack Mizrahi)	Jovan JR Taylor; Charles "Chizzy" Stephens; Lopez	Taylor; Thompson; C. Stephens; Rooney	3:55
12.	"Troubeaux" (featuring Nas)	Andrew "Pop" Wansel; Warren "Oak" Felder; Steve Mostyn; Tiyon Mack; Ursula Yancy; Nasir Jones; Lopez; Marty Balin; Paul Kantner	Pop & Oak; TheAceFace69; Rooney^{[b]}	4:05
13.	"Expertease (Ready Set Go)"	Felder; Mostyn; Sia Furler; Lopez	Oak Felder; TheAceFace69; RedOne^{[c]}; Rooney^{[b]}	4:04
14.	"Same Girl" (featuring French Montana)	Brown; Thompson; C. Stephens; Ryan "Ryghtous" Tedder; Lopez	Thompson; Tedder; C. Stephens; Rooney^{[b]}	4:06
Total length:				52:26

A.K.A. – Japanese and Target exclusive edition bonus tracks
No.	Title	Writer(s)	Producer(s)	Length
15.	"Charades"	Youngblood; Qura Rankin; Tina Davis; K. Stephens; Pitts; Lopez	Youngblood; Rankin^{[a]}; Rooney^{[b]}; Muzzy^{[b]}	2:52
16.	"Girls" (featuring Tyga)	Dijon McFarlane; Bryant; Michael Stevenson; Lopez	DJ Mustard; Rooney^{[b]}; Muzzy^{[b]}; Bryant^{[b]}	4:39
Total length:				59:57

Notes

- ^a signifies a co-producer
- ^b signifies a vocal producer
- ^c signifies an additional producer
- "Booty" contains a sample of "Dat a Freak" by Diplo and Swick (featuring TT the Artist and Lewis Cancut).
- "Troubeaux" contains:
  - A sample of the recording "Today", as performed by Tom Scott and The California Dreamers.
  - Samples from "Today", as written by Marty Balin and Paul Kantner.

== Charts ==
=== Weekly charts ===
Chart (2014)	Peak position
Australian Albums (ARIA)	24
Austrian Albums (Ö3 Austria)	40
Belgian Albums (Ultratop Flanders)	38
Belgian Albums (Ultratop Wallonia)	21
Canadian Albums (Billboard)	12
Chinese Albums (Sino Chart)	29
Croatian Albums (Toplista)	12
Dutch Albums (Album Top 100)	39
French Albums (SNEP)	70
German Albums (Offizielle Top 100)	24
Greek Albums (IFPI Greece)	4
Irish Albums (IRMA)	51
Italian Albums (FIMI)	13
Japanese Albums (Oricon)	38
Mexican Albums (AMPROFON)	33
Scottish Albums (Official Charts)	64
South Korean Albums (Circle)	58
Spanish Albums (Promusicae)	14
Swiss Albums (Schweizer Hitparade)	15
UK Albums (Official Charts)	41
UK R&B Albums (Official Charts)	4
US Billboard 200	8
US Top R&B/Hip-Hop Albums (Billboard)	1

=== Year-end charts ===
Chart (2014)	Position
US Billboard R&B Albums	25
US Billboard R&B/Hip-Hop Albums	50

== Release history ==
Country	Date	Edition(s)	Label
Germany	June 13, 2014	Standard; deluxe	Universal
Netherlands	June 13, 2014	Standard; deluxe	Universal
United Kingdom	June 16, 2014	Standard; deluxe	Capitol
Canada	June 17, 2014	Standard; deluxe	Universal
Poland	June 17, 2014	Standard; deluxe	Universal
Spain	June 17, 2014	Standard; deluxe	Universal
United States	June 17, 2014	Standard; deluxe	Capitol
Japan	June 18, 2014	Standard	Universal
Australia	June 20, 2014	Standard; deluxe	Universal
Brazil	June 20, 2014	Standard	Universal
France	June 30, 2014	Standard; deluxe	Universal

== See also ==
- List of Billboard number-one R&B albums of 2014
