= Jennifer Lopez discography =

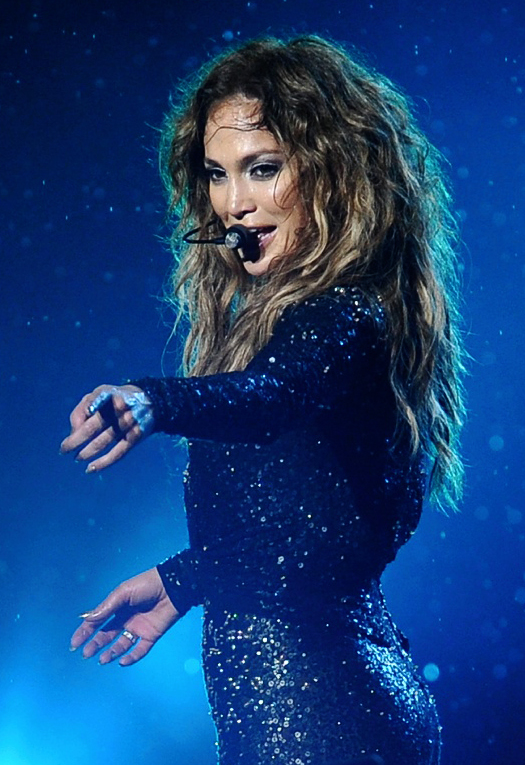
- Lopez performing during her Dance Again World Tour in 2012
- Studio albums: 9
- Extended plays: 1
- Soundtrack albums: 2
- Compilation albums: 3
- Singles: 67
- Remix albums: 1
- Charity singles: 5
- Promotional singles: 14

American singer Jennifer Lopez has released nine studio albums, one remix album, three compilation albums, two soundtrack, one extended play, 67 singles (including 14 as a featured artist), five charity singles and 13 promotional singles. As of 2022, the singer has sold more than 80 million records with 15 billion streams worldwide. She made her chart debut in May 1999 with "If You Had My Love", which topped the charts in six countries, including the United States. It was followed by the release of her debut studio album, On the 6 (1999), which reached the top five in several countries and produced four additional singles, including the international hit "Waiting for Tonight". The simultaneous release of her second studio album, J.Lo, and the film The Wedding Planner in January 2001 made Lopez the first entertainer to have a number-one film and album in the United States in the same week. The album was certified four-times platinum in the United States and yielded four hit singles, including "Love Don't Cost a Thing" and "I'm Real", which peaked at number one on the Billboard Hot 100. The following year saw the release of Lopez's remix album, J to tha L–O! The Remixes (2002), which became the first remix album in history to debut at number one on the Billboard 200, and went on to become one of the best selling remix albums of all time. Three singles were released from the album, including "Ain't It Funny (Murder Remix)", which topped the Billboard Hot 100 for six consecutive weeks.

Lopez's third studio album, This Is Me... Then (2002), reached number two on the Billboard 200, and earned double-platinum status in the United States. Four singles were released from the album, including the hits "Jenny from the Block" and "All I Have", which topped the charts in the United States and New Zealand. Her fourth studio album, Rebirth (2005), charted moderately in the United States, eventually earning a platinum certification. It produced two singles, including its lead single, "Get Right", which went number one in five countries. Lopez's first full-length Spanish album, Como Ama una Mujer, was released in March 2007 and peaked at number ten on the US Billboard 200. Two singles were released from the album, most notably "Qué Hiciste", which was an international success and was certified eight-times platinum in Spain. A little over six months later, the singer released her sixth studio album, Brave (2007), which became her first album to miss the top ten on the Billboard 200. Just like the album, its lead single, "Do It Well", was only a moderate success.

Following a move to Island Records from Sony Music, Lopez released her seventh studio album, Love?, in May 2011, which was a moderately successful, but brief, comeback for her. Three singles were released from the album, including "On the Floor", which became the singer's most successful single in her career. The song topped more than eighteen national charts and sold more than 8.4 million digital copies globally, making it the best-selling single of 2011 by a female artist. Lopez's first greatest hits album, Dance Again... the Hits (2012), followed a year later and produced the international hit "Dance Again". Her eighth studio album, A.K.A., was released in June 2014 by Capitol Records and became her lowest-selling album in the US. Three singles were released from the album, including "Booty", which reached the top 20 in Canada and the United States. After A.K.A.'s underperformance, Lopez then departed from the label and returned to Epic Records. Instead of releasing studio albums, she released several standalone singles such as "Ain't Your Mama", "Dinero" and "Pa' Ti". In 2022, in collaboration with Maluma, she released a movie soundtrack. In 2024, she released a sequel album to This Is Me... Then entitled This Is Me... Now, her first studio album in a decade.

== Albums ==
=== Studio albums ===
List of studio albums, with selected chart positions, sales figures, and certifications
Title	Album details	Peak chart positions										Sales	Certifications
Title	Album details	US	AUS	CAN	FRA	GER	ITA	JPN	SPA	SWI	UK	Sales	Certifications
On the 6	Released: June 1, 1999; Label: Work; Formats: CD; CD+VCD; cassette; Minidisc; digital download; streaming; LP	8	11	5	15	3	13	20	12	3	14	US: 2,900,000; FRA: 210,000; JPN: 200,000; SPA: 300,000; UK: 300,000	RIAA: 3× Platinum; ARIA: Platinum; BPI: Platinum; BVMI: Gold; FIMI: Platinum; IFPI SWI: Platinum; MC: 5× Platinum; PROMUSICAE: 2× Platinum; RIAJ: Gold; SNEP: 2× Gold
J.Lo	Released: January 16, 2001; Label: Epic; Formats: CD; cassette; box set; digital download; LP; Minidisc; streaming	1	2	1	6	1	5	14	1	1	2	US: 3,800,000; CAN: 282,348; GER: 400,000; JPN: 300,000; SPA: 200,000; UK: 606,500	RIAA: 4× Platinum; ARIA: 2× Platinum; BPI: 2× Platinum; BVMI: Platinum; IFPI SWI: 2× Platinum; MC: 2× Platinum; PROMUSICAE: 2× Platinum; RIAJ: Gold; SNEP: 2× Gold
This Is Me... Then	Released: November 25, 2002; Label: Epic; Formats: CD; LP; cassette; digital download; box set; streaming	2	14	5	4	4	11	9	12	3	13	US: 2,600,000; FRA: 220,000; GER: 200,000; UK: 610,000	RIAA: 2× Platinum; ARIA: Platinum; BPI: 2× Platinum; BVMI: Gold; FIMI: Gold; IFPI SWI: Platinum; MC: 2× Platinum; PROMUSICAE: Platinum; RIAJ: Gold; SNEP: 2× Gold
Rebirth	Released: March 1, 2005; Label: Epic; Formats: CD; CD+DVD; cassette; DualDisc; LP; digital download; streaming	2	10	2	7	3	3	3	2	1	8	US: 746,000; JPN: 244,689	RIAA: Platinum; ARIA: Gold; BPI: Gold; IFPI SWI: Gold; MC: Platinum; RIAJ: Gold; SNEP: Gold
Como Ama una Mujer	Released: March 23, 2007; Label: Epic; Formats: CD; CD+DVD; cassette; digital download; streaming	10	—	50	11	4	2	60	2	1	131	US: 218,000; SPA: 80,000; UK: 7,364	IFPI SWI: Platinum; PROMUSICAE: Platinum
Brave	Released: October 4, 2007; Label: Epic; Formats: CD; CD+DVD; cassette; digital download; streaming	12	46	13	28	41	10	6	21	6	24	US: 173,000; FRA: 9,000; JPN: 67,098; UK: 21,179	
Love?	Released: April 29, 2011; Label: Island; Formats: CD; box set; digital download; streaming	5	9	2	7	4	6	9	3	1	6	US: 353,000; FRA: 40,000; JPN: 59,415	BPI: Gold; BVMI: Gold; FIMI: Gold; IFPI SWI: Gold; MC: Platinum
A.K.A.	Released: June 13, 2014; Label: Capitol; Formats: CD; digital download; streaming	8	24	12	70	24	13	38	14	15	41	US: 81,000; FRA: 2,000	
This Is Me... Now	Released: February 16, 2024; Label: Nuyorican, BMG; Formats: CD; digital download; streaming; LP	38	82	77	38	8	37	—	20	17	55	US: 19,000 (Note: US sales, as of February 2024)	
"—" denotes items which were not released in that country or failed to chart.

=== Remix albums ===
List of remix albums, with selected chart positions, sales figures and certifications
Title	Album details	Peak chart positions									Sales	Certifications
Title	Album details	US	AUS	CAN	FRA	GER	NLD	SPA	SWI	UK	Sales	Certifications
J to tha L–O! The Remixes	Released: February 1, 2002; Label: Epic; Formats: CD; Cassette; LP; digital download; streaming	1	11	11	14	5	5	30	14	4	US: 1,500,000; UK: 452,000	RIAA: Platinum; ARIA: Gold; BPI: Platinum; MC: Platinum; NVPI: Gold; SNEP: Gold

=== Soundtrack albums ===
List of soundtrack albums, with selected details
Title	Album details	Peak chart positions					
Title	Album details	US	US Sound.	AUS	BEL (WA)	SPA	UK Sound.
Marry Me (with Maluma)	Released: February 4, 2022; Label: Sony Music Latin, Arista; Formats: CD; digital download; streaming	135	5	90	132	90	6
Kiss of the Spider Woman (with Diego Luna and Tonatiuh)	Released: October 3, 2025; Label: Lakeshore Records, Center Stage Records; Formats: CD; LP; digital download; streaming						

=== Compilation albums ===
List of compilation albums, with selected chart positions, sales figures and certifications
Title	Album details	Peak chart positions										Sales	Certifications
Title	Album details	US	AUS	CAN	FRA	GER	ITA	JPN	SPA	SWI	UK	Sales	Certifications
On the 6 / J.Lo	Released: September 27, 2004; Label: Epic; Formats: CD; box set; digital download; streaming	—	—	—	—	—	—	—	—	—	—		BPI: Silver
Triple Feature	Released: November 9, 2010; Label: Sony; Format: CD	—	—	—	—	—	—	—	—	—	—		
Dance Again... the Hits	Released: July 20, 2012; Label: Epic; Formats: CD; CD+DVD; digital download; streaming	20	20	3	12	15	3	11	5	7	4	US: 126,000; FRA: 9,000; JPN: 41,675	BPI: Platinum
"—" denotes items which were not released in that country or failed to chart.

== Extended plays ==
List of extended plays, with selected chart positions, sales figures and certifications
Title	EP details	Peak chart positions			Sales	Certifications
Title	EP details	US	FRA	JPN	Sales	Certifications
The Reel Me	Released: November 18, 2003; Label: Epic; Formats: CD+DVD; digital download; streaming	69	84	13	US: 254,000	RIAA: 3× Platinum

== Singles ==
=== 1990s ===
List of singles in the 1990s decade, with selected chart positions and certifications
Title	Year	Peak chart positions										Certifications	Album
Title	Year	US	AUS	BEL (WA)	CAN	FRA	GER	ITA	SPA	SWI	UK	Certifications	Album
"If You Had My Love"	1999	1	1	3	1	4	5	4	7	5	4	RIAA: Platinum; ARIA: 2× Platinum; BEA: Platinum; BPI: Platinum; BVMI: Gold; IFPI SWI: Gold; SNEP: Gold	On the 6
"No Me Ames" (with Marc Anthony)	1999	— (Note: "No Me Ames" failed to enter the Billboard Hot 100, but peaked at number one on the Hot Latin Songs chart.)	—	—	—	—	—	—	—	—	—		On the 6
"Waiting for Tonight"	1999	8	4	4	13	10	15	7	2	14	5	RIAA: Platinum; ARIA: 2× Platinum; BEA: Gold; BPI: Gold; SNEP: Gold	On the 6
"—" denotes a recording that did not chart or was not released in that territory.

=== 2000s ===
List of singles in the 2000s decade, with selected chart positions and certifications
Title	Year	Peak chart positions										Certifications	Album
Title	Year	US	AUS	BEL (WA)	CAN	FRA	GER	ITA	SPA	SWI	UK	Certifications	Album
"Feelin' So Good" (featuring Big Pun and Fat Joe)	2000	51	20	24	7	—	39	27	—	22	15	ARIA: Gold	On the 6
"Let's Get Loud"	2000	—	9	21	26	40	13	6	—	10	—	RIAA: Platinum; ARIA: 3× Platinum; BEA: Gold; BPI: Silver; BVMI: Gold; FIMI: Gold; PROMUSICAE: Gold	On the 6
"Love Don't Cost a Thing"	2000	3	4	2	1	5	6	1	1	2	1	ARIA: 2× Platinum; BEA: Gold; BPI: Platinum; IFPI SWI: Gold	J.Lo
"Play"	2001	18	14	8	5	20	19	8	14	10	3	ARIA: Platinum; BEA: Gold; BPI: Silver	J.Lo
"I'm Real" (solo or remix featuring Ja Rule)	2001	1	3	5	6	3	11	16	—	6	4	ARIA: 3× Platinum; BEA: Gold; BPI: Gold; SNEP: Gold	J.Lo
"Ain't It Funny"	2001	—	25	5	—	13	13	17	10	9	3	ARIA: Platinum; BEA: Gold; BPI: Gold	J.Lo
"Ain't It Funny (Murder Remix)" (featuring Ja Rule and Caddillac Tah)	2002	1	9	24	12	—	18	—	16	7	4	ARIA: Gold	J to tha L–O! The Remixes
"I'm Gonna Be Alright (Track Masters remix)" (featuring Nas)	2002	10	16	26	29	12	6	24	—	4	3	ARIA: Gold; BPI: Silver	J to tha L–O! The Remixes
"Alive"	2002	—	—	—	—	—	—	—	—	—	—		J to tha L–O! The Remixes
"Jenny from the Block" (featuring Jadakiss and Styles)	2002	3	5	6	1	5	7	4	2	4	3	RIAA: Platinum; ARIA: 3× Platinum; BEA: Gold; BPI: Platinum; BVMI: Gold; FIMI: Gold; IFPI SWI: Gold; SNEP: Gold	This Is Me... Then
"All I Have" (featuring LL Cool J)	2002	1	2	16	6	29	19	13	—	4	2	RIAA: Platinum; ARIA: 2× Platinum; BPI: Gold	This Is Me... Then
"I'm Glad"	2003	32	10	30	8	—	44	17	19	21	11	ARIA: Gold	This Is Me... Then
"Baby I Love U!"	2003	72	—	—	—	—	—	—	—	—	3		This Is Me... Then
"Get Right"	2005	12	3	2	3	2	7	1	3	3	1	RIAA: Gold; ARIA: 2× Platinum; BPI: Platinum; SNEP: Gold	Rebirth
"Hold You Down" (featuring Fat Joe)	2005	64	17	—	—	—	44	22	12	44	6		Rebirth
"Control Myself" (LL Cool J featuring Jennifer Lopez)	2006	4	17	—	4	—	25	—	—	—	2	RIAA: Gold; BPI: Silver	Todd Smith
"Qué Hiciste"	2007	86	—	11	—	—	10	1	1	1	162	PROMUSICAE: 8× Platinum	Como Ama una Mujer
"Me Haces Falta"	2007	—	—	—	—	—	—	—	—	—	—		Como Ama una Mujer
"Do It Well"	2007	31	18	20	23	29	30	2	—	12	11		Brave
"Hold It Don't Drop It"	2007	— (Note: "Hold It Don't Drop It" failed to enter the Billboard Hot 100, but peaked at number one on the Hot Dance Club Songs chart.)	—	—	—	—	—	4	—	—	72		Brave
"This Boy's Fire" (Santana featuring Jennifer Lopez)	2007	—	—	—	—	—	—	—	—	—	—		Ultimate Santana
"Louboutins"	2009	— (Note: "Louboutins" failed to enter the Billboard Hot 100, but peaked at number one on the Hot Dance Club Songs chart.)	—	—	—	—	—	—	—	—	—		Non-album single
"—" denotes a recording that did not chart or was not released in that territory.

=== 2010s ===
List of singles in the 2010s decade, with selected chart positions and certifications
Title	Year	Peak chart positions										Certifications	Album
Title	Year	US	US Latin	AUS	CAN	FRA	GER	ITA	SPA	SWI	UK	Certifications	Album
"On the Floor" (featuring Pitbull)	2011	3	2	1	1	1	1	1	1	1	1	RIAA: 8× Platinum; ARIA: 4× Platinum; BEA: Platinum; BPI: 3× Platinum; BVMI: 7× Gold; FIMI: 3× Platinum; IFPI SWI: 4× Platinum; MC: 5× Platinum; PROMUSICAE: 3× Platinum	Love?
"I'm Into You" (featuring Lil Wayne)	2011	41	37	45	55	38	16	18	17	22	9	RIAA: Gold; BPI: Gold; BVMI: Gold; FIMI: Gold; MC: Gold; IFPI SWI: Gold	Love?
"Papi"	2011	96	—	—	50	28	—	3	18	37	67	FIMI: Platinum; MC: Gold	Love?
"T.H.E. (The Hardest Ever)" (will.i.am featuring Mick Jagger and Jennifer Lopez)	2011	36	45	57	10	—	—	—	—	41	3	BPI: Silver	Non-album single
"Dance Again" (featuring Pitbull)	2012	17	16	28	4	15	14	7	4	14	11	RIAA: Platinum; ARIA: Platinum; BEA: Gold; BPI: Silver; BVMI: Platinum; FIMI: Platinum; MC: Platinum; PROMUSICAE: Gold	Dance Again... the Hits
"Follow the Leader" (Wisin & Yandel featuring Jennifer Lopez)	2012	— (Note: "Follow the Leader" did not enter the Billboard Hot 100, but peaked at number five on the Bubbling Under Hot 100 Singles chart.)	1	—	—	177	—	—	26	—	—	RIAA: Gold	Líderes
"Goin' In" (featuring Flo Rida)	2012	— (Note: "Goin' In" failed to enter the Billboard Hot 100, but peaked at number one on the Hot Dance Club Songs chart.)	31	—	54	—	67	99	—	—	—		Step Up Revolution
"Quizás, Quizás, Quizás" (Andrea Bocelli featuring Jennifer Lopez)	2013	—	45	—	—	—	—	—	—	—	—		Passione
"Sweet Spot" (Flo Rida featuring Jennifer Lopez)	2013	—	—	25	—	195	—	—	—	—	—	ARIA: Gold	Wild Ones
"Live It Up" (featuring Pitbull)	2013	60	—	20	16	67	36	36	10	33	17	ARIA: Gold; MC: Gold	Non-album singles
"Adrenalina" (Wisin featuring Jennifer Lopez and Ricky Martin)	2014	94	2	—	—	122	—	52	3	57	—	FIMI: Gold; PROMUSICAE: 2× Platinum	Non-album singles
"I Luh Ya Papi" (featuring French Montana)	2014	77	—	—	78	—	—	—	—	—	170		A.K.A.
"We Are One (Ole Ola)" (Pitbull featuring Jennifer Lopez and Claudia Leitte)	2014	59	—	61	51	3	6	2	4	2	29	RIAA: Gold; BVMI: Gold; FIMI: Platinum; IFPI SWI: Gold; PROMUSICAE: Platinum	One Love, One Rhythm
"First Love"	2014	87	—	—	—	193	—	41	—	—	63		A.K.A.
"Booty" (featuring Iggy Azalea or Pitbull)	2014	18	—	27	11	93	78	97	—	—	137	RIAA: Platinum	A.K.A.
"Feel the Light"	2015	—	—	—	—	—	—	—	—	—	—		Home
"Stressin" (Fat Joe featuring Jennifer Lopez)	2015	—	—	—	—	—	—	—	—	—	—		Non-album single
"Back It Up" (Prince Royce featuring Jennifer Lopez and Pitbull)	2015	92	19	—	56	—	—	—	40	—	—	PROMUSICAE: Gold	Double Vision
"El Mismo Sol" (Álvaro Soler featuring Jennifer Lopez)	2015	—	11	—	—	—	—	—	6	—	—	PROMUSICAE: 2× Platinum	Eterno Agosto
"Try Me" (Jason Derulo featuring Jennifer Lopez and Matoma)	2015	—	—	—	—	168	39	—	57	—	113	BVMI: Gold	Everything Is 4
"Ain't Your Mama"	2016	76	—	85	34	11	5	32	4	16	182	RIAA: Gold; ARIA: Platinum; BPI: Silver; BVMI: Platinum; FIMI: 2× Platinum; PROMUSICAE: 3× Platinum; SNEP: Diamond	Non-album single
"Chegaste" (with Roberto Carlos)	2016	—	—	—	—	—	—	—	—	—	—		Roberto Carlos
"Ni Tú Ni Yo" (featuring Gente de Zona)	2017	— (Note: "Ni Tú Ni Yo" did not enter the Billboard Hot 100, but peaked at number 15 on the Billboard Hot Latin Songs chart.)	15	—	—	82	—	—	24	30	—	PROMUSICAE: Gold	Non-album singles
"Amor, Amor, Amor" (featuring Wisin)	2017	— (Note: "Amor, Amor, Amor" did not enter the Billboard Hot 100, but peaked at number 19 on the Bubbling Under Hot 100 Singles chart.)	10	—	—	120	—	99	60	33	—		Non-album singles
"Us"	2018	—	—	—	—	—	—	—	—	—	—		Non-album singles
"Se Acabó el Amor" (with Abraham Mateo and Yandel)	2018	—	19	—	—	—	—	—	64	83	—	RIAA: Platinum (Latin)	A Cámara Lenta
"El Anillo"	2018	— (Note: "El Anillo" did not enter the Billboard Hot 100, but peaked at number 10 on the Bubbling Under Hot 100 Singles chart.)	12	—	—	163	—	—	9	93	—	RIAA: 8× Platinum (Latin); PROMUSICAE: Platinum	Non-album singles
"Dinero" (featuring DJ Khaled and Cardi B)	2018	80	—	—	75	140	—	—	—	—	—	RIAA: Gold	Non-album singles
"Te Guste" (with Bad Bunny)	2018	—	12	—	—	—	—	—	52	—	—		Non-album singles
"Limitless" (from the movie Second Act)	2018	—	—	—	—	—	—	—	—	—	—		Non-album singles
"Te Boté II" (Casper Magico, Nio Garcia and Cosculluela featuring Wisin, Yandel and JLo)	2018	—	—	—	—	—	—	—	—	—	—	RIAA: Platinum (Latin)	Non-album singles
"That's How Strong Our Love Is" (Bryan Adams featuring Jennifer Lopez)	2019	—	—	—	—	—	—	—	—	—	—		Shine a Light
"Medicine" (featuring French Montana)	2019	— (Note: "Medicine" failed to enter the Billboard Hot 100, but peaked at number one on the Hot Dance Club Songs chart.)	—	—	91	—	—	—	—	—	—		Non-album singles
"Baila Conmigo"	2019	—	—	—	—	—	—	—	—	—	—	RIAA: Platinum (Latin)	Non-album singles
"—" denotes a recording that did not chart or was not released in that territory.

=== 2020s ===
List of singles in the 2020s decade, with selected chart positions and certifications
Title	Year	Peak chart positions										Certifications	Album
Title	Year	US	US Latin	CAN Dig.	FRA	HUN	MEX Air.	SPA	SWI	UK Dig.	WW	Certifications	Album
"Pa' Ti" (with Maluma)	2020	— (Note: "Pa' Ti" did not enter the Billboard Hot 100 but peaked at number 25 on the Bubbling Under Hot 100 Singles chart.)	9	33	—	5	41	57	74	—	106	RIAA: 3× Platinum (Latin); AMPROFON: Gold	Marry Me
"Lonely" (with Maluma)	2020	—	—	33	—	19	—	—	—	—	—		Non-album singles
"In the Morning"	2020	—	—	13	—	16	—	—	—	93	—		Non-album singles
"It's the Most Wonderful Time of the Year" (with Stevie Mackey and The Eleven)	2020	— (Note: "It's the Most Wonderful Time of the Year" did not enter the Billboard Hot 100 but peaked at 24 on the Adult Contemporary Chart.)	—	—	—	—	—	—	—	—	—		The Most Wonderful Time
"Cambia el Paso" (with Rauw Alejandro)	2021	—	21	42	—	17	—	98	—	—	—		Non-album single
"On My Way (Marry Me)"	2021	—	—	24	—	18	—	—	—	64	—		Marry Me
"Marry Me" (with Maluma)	2022	—	—	—	—	8	34	—	—	78	—		Marry Me
"Can't Get Enough"	2024	— (Note: "Can't Get Enough" did not enter the Billboard Hot 100 but peaked at 18 on the Adult Pop Airplay Chart.)	—	—	—	—	*	—	—	41	—		This Is Me... Now
"Rebound"	2024	—	—	—	—	—	*	—	—	—	—		This Is Me... Now
"Birthday"	2025	—	—	—	—	—	*	—	—	—	—		Non-album singles
"Save Me Tonight" (with David Guetta)	2026	— (Note: "Save Me Tonight" did not enter the Billboard Hot 100 but peaked at 1 on the Dance/Mix Show Airplay chart.)	—	—	48	—	*	—	—	18	—	SNEP: Gold	Non-album singles
"Everything's Fine" (AM & PM) (with Alok)	2026	—	—	—	—	—	*	—	—	—	—		Non-album singles
"—" denotes a recording that did not chart or was not released in that territory. "*" denotes that the chart did not exist at that time.

== Charity singles ==
List of charity singles, with selected chart positions
Title	Year	Peak chart positions			
Title	Year	US	GER	SWI	UK
"El Ultimo Adios (The Last Goodbye)" (among various artists)	2001	— (Note: "El Ultimo Adios (The Last Goodbye)" failed to enter the Billboard Hot 100, but the CD single peaked at number 197 on the Billboard Top 200.)	—	—	—
"What's Going On" (among Artists Against AIDS Worldwide)	2001	27	35	16	6
"Hands" (among Various Artists for Orlando)	2016	—	—	—	—
"Love Make the World Go Round" (with Lin-Manuel Miranda)	2016	72	—	—	—
"Almost Like Praying" (Lin-Manuel Miranda featuring Artists for Puerto Rico)	2017	20	—	—	—
"—" denotes a recording that did not chart or was not released in that territory.

== Promotional singles ==
List of promotional singles, with selected chart positions
Title	Year	Peak chart positions			Album
Title	Year	US Dance	RUS	SPA	Album
"Spanish Fly" (Black Rob featuring Jennifer Lopez)	1999	—	—	—	Life Story
"Open Off My Love"	1999	—	—	—	On the 6
"El Deseo De Tu Amor"	2000	—	—	—	On the 6
"Si Ya Se Acabó"	2001	—	—	—	J.Lo
"Cariño"	2001	—	—	—	J.Lo
"Brave"	2008	—	7	—	Brave
"Fresh Out the Oven" (featuring Pitbull)	2009	1	103	—	Non-album single
"Good Hit"	2011	—	—	—	Love?
"(What Is) Love?"	2011	—	—	33	Love?
"Girls"	2014	—	—	—	A.K.A.
"Same Girl"	2014	—	—	—	A.K.A.
"A Selena Tribute"	2015	—	—	—	Non-album singles
"Olvídame y Pega la Vuelta" (with Marc Anthony)	2016	—	—	—	Non-album singles
"Same Girl" (Halftime Remix) (featuring French Montana)	2022	—	—	—	Non-album singles
"This Is Your Land" (featuring The United States Marine Band)	2022	—	—	—	Non-album singles
"This Is Me... Now"	2024	—	—	—	This Is Me... Now
"This Time Around" (featuring (G)I-dle)	2024	—	—	—	This Is Me... Now
"Kiss of the Spider Woman"	2025	—	—	—	Kiss of the Spider Woman
"Never You"	2025	—	—	—	Kiss of the Spider Woman
"—" denotes a recording that did not chart or was not released in that territory.

== Guest appearances ==
Title	Year	Other artist(s)	Album
"Hands Up"	2004	Clinton Sparks, Clipse	White Chicks Like Mixtapes Too
"Dynamite" (Remix)	2010	Taio Cruz	Rokstarr
"Drinks for You (Ladies Anthem)"	2012	Pitbull	Global Warming
"Quizas, Quizas, Quizas"	2013	Andrea Bocelli	Passione
"Physical"	2014	Enrique Iglesias	Sex and Love
"Feel the Light"	2015	none	Home
"Try Me"	2015	Jason Derulo, Matoma	Everything Is 4 and Hakuna Matoma
"Sexy Body"	2017	Pitbull	Climate Change
"Put Your Lovin' Where Your Mouth Is"	2018	Poo Bear	Poo Bear Presents Bearthday Music
"That's How Strong Our Love Is"	2019	Bryan Adams	Shine a Light
"Miami"	2022	Wisin & Yandel	La Ultima Mision
