= El Anillo =

Single by Jennifer Lopez
- Language: Spanish
- English title: "The Ring"
- Released: April 26, 2018
- Genre: Brazilian funk
- Length: 2:56
- Label: Nuyorican; Sony Latin
- Songwriters: Oscar "Oscarcito" Hernández; Édgar "Edge" Barrera; Jesús "DalePlay" Herrera; Andrés Castro
- Producers: Jesús "DalePlay" Herrera; Hernández; Castro; Barrera; Steve Mackey

Jennifer Lopez singles chronology
| "Se Acabó el Amor" (2018) | "El Anillo" (2018) | "Dinero" (2018) |

Music video
- "El Anillo" on YouTube

"El Anillo" (Spanish for 'The Ring'; pronounced [el aˈniʝo]) is a song recorded by American singer Jennifer Lopez. It was written and produced by Édgar "Edge" Barrera, Andrés Castro, Oscar "Oscarcito" Hernández and Jesús "DalePlay" Herrera, while vocal production was handled by Steve Mackey and Hernández. The song was released digitally on April 26, 2018, by Nuyorican Productions and Sony Music Latin.

== Background ==
Lopez began dating former baseball player Alex Rodriguez in February 2017. Oscar "Oscarcito" Hernández, who had co-written Lopez's previous Spanish singles "Ni Tú Ni Yo" and "Amor, Amor, Amor" (both released in 2017), came to her with an idea for a song which he described as "a little crazy". Lopez was surprised when the song was presented to her, given how personal it was. Explaining how the song developed, Lopez said: "Somebody wrote it for me specifically, which I thought was really funny. Not because I'm thinking of doing anything like this, but because it's a funny thing and I played it for Alex and I was like, 'Are you cool with this? I think it's kind of funny.' He's like, 'Yeah, I'm totally cool with it.'"

== Composition ==
"El Anillo" is a Latin pop song with a Brazilian funk beat, which Lopez had asked the song's producers to incorporate. It was written by Edgar Barrera, Andrés Castro, Oscar Hernández and Jesús Herrera. Described as "sexy and provocative" by Jennifer Machin of Billboard, the song alludes to Lopez's relationship with Alex Rodriguez, with lyrics such as "Me tratas como una princesa y me das lo que pido. Tu tienes el bate y la fuerza que yo necesito", which in English translates to "You treat me like a princess and give me what I ask. You have the bat and the strength I need." Telemundo characterized the song as "an anthem for all the women out there that have put their time and effort in a relationship, and now all they're waiting for is that big rock on their finger."

== Critical response ==
Michael Love Michael, writing for Paper magazine, praised the track's "sound-the-alarm production" and described Lopez's delivery as "characteristically fierce". Rolling Stone writer Suzy Exposito noted, "J.Lo's latest streak of Spanish-language singles is crowned by the baile funk-infused track", describing "El Anillo" as "quite the bounce-back" from Lopez's "ballad-heavy" first Spanish album, Como Ama una Mujer (2007).

== Chart performance ==
For the week ending May 3, 2018, "El Anillo" debuted at number twenty-one in Spain, higher than the peak positions of her previous Spanish singles, "Ni Tú Ni Yo" and "Amor, Amor, Amor". It later peaked at number nine, becoming her thirteenth top-ten single there, and was certified Platinum by Productores de Música de España for sales of 40,000 units. In the United States, the song peaked at number twelve on the Hot Latin Songs chart. On June 25, 2018, it was certified double platinum by the Recording Industry Association of America, denoting sales of 120,000 units. On the chart dated July 14, 2018, "El Anillo" reached number one on both the US Latin Airplay and Latin Rhythm Airplay charts. It rose more than 88% to 16 million in audience impressions during the week ending July 8, 2018, which Billboard attributed to the release of the remix with Ozuna. This gave Lopez her eighth number one on the Latin Airplay chart, and third in 2018, following "Amor, Amor, Amor" and "Se Acabó el Amor". On the Latin Rhythm Airplay chart, it became her fourth number one, extending her record as the female with the most number ones.

== Music video ==
The music video "El Anillo" was directed by Santiago Salviche and shot in Los Angeles. In the clip, Lopez plays a queen whose affections must be won by a potential suitor played by Spanish actor Miguel Ángel Silvestre. An engagement ring can be seen falling into a dark puddle in one of the opening shots. The dance routine featured in the music video was choreographed by Kiel Tutin. According to Billboard, the fashion in the video consists of "sparkly outfits by international designers, fit for a gold-draped queen", complete with "elaborate crowns and opulent headpieces". Among the designers whose work was featured in "El Anillo" include Indian couture label Khosla Jani, Laurel Dewitt, Giannina Azar and Lebanese designer Elie Madi. The singer described its plot as "all these queens from all over the world who come together because they're having this ceremony where a king has to fight to even be able to ask this person to marry them ... So all the queens come together and they really put him through the wringer." She further added: "It's probably one of my favorite videos I've ever made. This is something on another level that I really love ... That whole idea of women being queens and understanding that and treating [themselves] like that and making somebody fight for you. That's what the concept of it was. It's like, fight for me and then you can ask me to marry you. Then, okay, where's my ring?"

After three days, the clip had received over 10 million views. In less than two months following its release, the video had received 125 million views on YouTube and Vevo. Kayleigh Roberts of Marie Claire said: "The video is gorgeous on a grand scale and regal in every way", comparing it to the styles of Game of Thrones and Black Panther, noting that Lopez gives off "fierce Cersei Lannister vibes in a luxurious throne room." Chloe Herring of the Miami Herald noted that Lopez "laid her demands on the table" and "proves she's a Latin goddess worth keeping around" in "El Anillo". Telemundo compared the video to Beyoncé's "Single Ladies (Put a Ring on It)", writing: "Think of it as if 'Single Ladies' got medieval, with Latin/Samba beats."

== Live performances ==
Lopez debuted the single with a performance at the 2018 Billboard Latin Music Awards, which Billboard said "showcased Lopez's versatile style". She wore a jewel-encrusted jumpsuit and matching headpiece, backed by dancers and a large lotus flower on stage. The song was later included in the set list of It's My Party (2019), Lopez’s tour celebrating her 50th birthday. During the ”El Anillo” segment of the concert, Lopez and her dancers executed seamless choreography, which, towards the end of the song, featured an extended salsa dance break. In addition to her dancers showcasing their own skills, Lopez showed off her own salsa steps, was flipped upside-down several times and ended the song by dancing on top of a grand piano. In a review of the show, Althea Legaspi of the Chicago Tribune wrote: "She gave a fierce delivery of the song about having everything but that ring around her finger, enhanced by her adept band's Brazilian funk beats." Elements of "El Anillo" were also included in Lopez's performances at the 2018 MTV Video Music Awards and the Super Bowl LIV halftime show in February 2020.

== Remix ==
In July 2018, a remix of the song featuring Puerto Rican singer Ozuna was leaked online. It was serviced to radio stations in the US on July 2, 2018. Billboard wrote that "The remix offers a saucy reggaetón/trap flavor, giving a different twist to the song".

== Personnel ==
Credits adapted from Tidal.

- Édgar "Edge" Barrera – production, writing, recording engineer
- Luis Barrera Jr. – mixing engineer
- Andrés Castro – production, writing, guitar, recording engineer
- Oscar "Oscarcito" Hernández – production, writing, background vocals, vocal producer
- Jesús "DalePlay" Herrera – production, writing
- Dave Kutch – mastering engineer
- Jennifer Lopez – vocals
- Steve Mackey – vocal producer
- Trevor Muzzy – engineer
- Alejandro M. Reglero – A&R

== Charts ==
=== Weekly charts ===
==== Original version ====
| Chart (2018) | Peak position |
|---|---|
| Argentina (Argentina Hot 100) | 73 |
| Bolivia (Monitor Latino) | 9 |
| Dominican Republic (SODINPRO) | 15 |
| Ecuador (National-Report) | 17 |
| France (SNEP) | 163 |
| Guatemala (Monitor Latino) | 13 |
| Honduras (Monitor Latino) | 18 |
| Italy (Musica e dischi) | 25 |
| Latin America (Monitor Latino) | 16 |
| Mexico Espanol Airplay (Billboard) | 50 |
| Nicaragua (Monitor Latino) | 9 |
| Panama (Monitor Latino) | 5 |
| Puerto Rico Pop (Monitor Latino) | 17 |
| Spain (PROMUSICAE) | 9 |
| Switzerland (Schweizer Hitparade) | 93 |
| Uruguay Pop (Monitor Latino) | 11 |
| US Bubbling Under Hot 100 (Billboard) | 10 |
| US Hot Latin Songs (Billboard) | 12 |
| US Latin Airplay (Billboard) | 1 |
| Venezuela Airplay (Monitor Latino) | 1 |

==== Remix version ====
| Chart (2018) | Peak position |
|---|---|
| Argentina (Argentina Hot 100) | 57 |
| Spain (PROMUSICAE) | 41 |

=== Year-end charts ===
==== Original version ====
| Chart (2018) | Position |
|---|---|
| Bolivia (Monitor Latino) | 41 |
| Panama (Monitor Latino) | 38 |
| Puerto Rico (Monitor Latino) | 75 |
| Spain (PROMUSICAE) | 63 |
| Venezuela Airplay (Monitor Latino) | 50 |

== Certifications ==
| Region | Certification | Certified units/sales |
|---|---|---|
| Mexico (AMPROFON) | Platinum | 60,000^{‡} |
| Spain (Promusicae) | Platinum | 40,000^{‡} |
| United States (RIAA) | 8× Platinum (Latin) | 480,000^{‡} |
^{‡} Sales+streaming figures based on certification alone.

== Release history ==
| Country | Date | Format | Label | Ref. |
|---|---|---|---|---|
| France | April 26, 2018 | Digital download; streaming | Nuyorican; Sony Latin | |
| Germany | April 26, 2018 | Digital download; streaming | Nuyorican; Sony Latin | |
| Italy | April 26, 2018 | Digital download; streaming | Nuyorican; Sony Latin | |
| Spain | April 26, 2018 | Digital download; streaming | Nuyorican; Sony Latin | |
| United Kingdom | April 26, 2018 | Digital download; streaming | Nuyorican; Sony Latin | |
| United States | April 26, 2018 | Digital download; streaming | Nuyorican; Sony Latin | |

== See also ==
- List of Billboard number-one Latin songs of 2018
