= 2018 MTV Video Music Awards =

Award ceremony

- Date: Monday, August 20, 2018 at 9:00–11:43pm EDT
- Venue: Radio City Music Hall (Midtown Manhattan, Manhattan, New York City, New York)
- Country: United States

Highlights
- Most awards: Cardi B and Childish Gambino (3 each)
- Most nominations: Cardi B (12)
- Website: www.mtv.com/vma

Television/radio coverage
- Network: MTV; MTV2; VH1; MTV Classic; BET; CMT; Comedy Central; Logo TV; Paramount Network; TV Land; BET Her
- Produced by: Bruce Gillmer; Jesse Ignjatovic
- Directed by: Alex Rudzinski

The 2018 MTV Video Music Awards were held on Monday night, August 20, 2018 at 9:00–11:43pm EDT at Radio City Music Hall in Midtown Manhattan, Manhattan, New York City. The 35th annual award show aired live from the venue for the 12th time, the most of any previous venue in its history. Cardi B led the list of nominees with twelve nominations. Cardi and Childish Gambino were the most awarded of the night with three each. Camila Cabello won Video of the Year and Artist of the Year, while Jennifer Lopez became the first Latino to receive the Michael Jackson Video Vanguard Award. This edition of the MTV Video Music Awards saw yet another severe drop in ratings, only achieving a mere 2.2 million viewers on MTV, and only seeing 4.87 million viewers on all of its sister networks.

== Performances ==
List of musical performances
Artist(s)	Song(s)
Pre-show
Bazzi	"Mine"
Bryce Vine	"Drew Barrymore"
Backstreet Boys	"Don't Go Breaking My Heart"
Main show
Shawn Mendes	"In My Blood"
Logic; Ryan Tedder	"One Day"
Panic! at the Disco	"High Hopes"
Nicki Minaj	"Majesty" "Barbie Dreams" "Ganja Burn" "Fefe" (Live from the PATH World Trade Center station)
Jennifer Lopez	Michael Jackson Video Vanguard Medley: 1. "Waiting for Tonight (Hex Hector Remix)"; 2. "On the Floor"; 3. "Dance Again"; 4. "Ain't Your Mama"; 5. "If You Had My Love (Pablo Flores Remix)" (dance break); 6. "El Anillo" / "Booty"; 7. "Love Don't Cost a Thing" (with elements of "In My Feelings" and "Nice for What" by Drake); 8. "I'm Glad"; 9. "Get Right (Rock-Infused Version)"; 10. "All I Have"; 11. "Jenny from the Block" (with intro by DJ Khaled); 12. "I'm Real (Murder Remix)" (with Ja Rule); 13. "Ain't It Funny (Murder Remix)" (with Ja Rule); 14. "Dinero" (with elements of "Bodak Yellow" by Cardi B and "Bitch Better Have My Money" by Rihanna) (with DJ Khaled)
Ariana Grande	"God Is a Woman"
Travis Scott; James Blake	"Stargazing" "Stop Trying to Be God" "Sicko Mode"
Maluma	"Felices los 4"
Post Malone; 21 Savage; Aerosmith	"Rockstar" (Post Malone and 21 Savage) "Dream On" (Aerosmith and Post Malone) "Toys in the Attic" (Aerosmith and Post Malone)
Push Artist Stage
Bazzi	"Beautiful"
Jessie Reyez	"Apple Juice"
Hayley Kiyoko	"Curious"
PrettyMuch	"Summer on You"
Juice Wrld	"Lucid Dreams"

== Presenters ==
=== Pre-show ===
- Terrence J – presented Song of Summer and Push Artist of the Year

=== Main show ===
- Cardi B – opened the show and introduced Shawn Mendes
- Kevin Hart and Tiffany Haddish – did a brief comedy routine and presented Best Hip Hop
- G-Eazy and Shay Mitchell – introduced Bazzi on the Push Artist stage
- Anna Kendrick and Blake Lively – presented Best Pop
- Teyana Taylor and Kyle – introduced Logic and Ryan Tedder
- Ken Jeong – announced the top 2 nominees for Best New Artist and explained voting procedures
- Jimmy Fallon – introduced Panic! at the Disco
- Backstreet Boys – presented Song of the Year
- Liam Payne and Shanina Shaik – presented Best Latin
- Shawn Mendes – presented the Video Vanguard Award
- Social House and Karlie Kloss – introduced Ariana Grande
- Keegan-Michael Key and Olivia Munn – presented Artist of the Year
- Millie Bobby Brown – presented Best New Artist
- DJ Khaled – introduced Travis Scott and James Blake
- Gucci Mane – presented Best Collaboration
- Amandla Stenberg, Algee Smith and Sabrina Carpenter – presented Video with a Message
- Rita Ora and Bebe Rexha – introduced Maluma
- Madonna – made a tribute speech about Aretha Franklin and presented Video of the Year
- Lenny Kravitz – introduced Post Malone and 21 Savage

== Winners and nominees ==
The nominees for most categories were revealed on July 16, 2018, via an IGTV video. Nominees for Song of Summer, however, were announced on August 13, 2018. Cardi B had the most nominations with 12, with The Carters behind with 8, while Childish Gambino and Drake both received 7 nominations each. Winners were announced on August 20, 2018, on the Video Music Awards broadcast.

Video of the Year	Song of the Year
Camila Cabello (featuring Young Thug) — "Havana"; The Carters — "Apeshit"; Childish Gambino — "This Is America"; Drake — "God's Plan"; Ariana Grande — "No Tears Left to Cry"; Bruno Mars (featuring Cardi B) — "Finesse (Remix)"	Post Malone (featuring 21 Savage) – "Rockstar"; Camila Cabello (featuring Young Thug) – "Havana"; Drake – "God's Plan"; Dua Lipa – "New Rules"; Bruno Mars (featuring Cardi B) – "Finesse (Remix)"; Ed Sheeran – "Perfect"
Artist of the Year	Best New Artist
Camila Cabello; Cardi B; Drake; Ariana Grande; Post Malone; Bruno Mars	Cardi B; Bazzi; Chloe x Halle; Hayley Kiyoko; Lil Pump; Lil Uzi Vert
Best Collaboration	Push Artist of the Year
Jennifer Lopez (featuring DJ Khaled and Cardi B) – "Dinero"; The Carters – "Apeshit"; Logic (featuring Alessia Cara and Khalid) – "1-800-273-8255"; Bruno Mars (featuring Cardi B) – "Finesse (Remix)"; N.E.R.D and Rihanna – "Lemon"; Bebe Rexha (featuring Florida Georgia Line) – "Meant to Be"	Hayley Kiyoko; Bishop Briggs; Chloe x Halle; Noah Cyrus; Tee Grizzley; Kacy Hill; Khalid; Kyle; Lil Xan; PrettyMuch; Jessie Reyez; Sigrid; SZA; Grace VanderWaal; Why Don't We
Best Pop	Best Hip Hop
Ariana Grande – "No Tears Left to Cry"; Camila Cabello (featuring Young Thug) – "Havana"; Demi Lovato – "Sorry Not Sorry"; Shawn Mendes – "In My Blood"; Pink – "What About Us"; Ed Sheeran – "Perfect"	Nicki Minaj – "Chun-Li"; Cardi B (featuring 21 Savage) – "Bartier Cardi"; The Carters – "Apeshit"; J. Cole – "ATM"; Drake – "God's Plan"; Migos (featuring Drake) – "Walk It Talk It"
Best Latin	Best Dance
J Balvin and Willy William – "Mi Gente"; Daddy Yankee – "Dura"; Luis Fonsi and Demi Lovato – "Échame la Culpa"; Jennifer Lopez (featuring DJ Khaled and Cardi B) – "Dinero"; Maluma – "Felices los 4"; Shakira (featuring Maluma) – "Chantaje"	Avicii (featuring Rita Ora) – "Lonely Together"; The Chainsmokers – "Everybody Hates Me"; David Guetta and Sia – "Flames"; Calvin Harris and Dua Lipa – "One Kiss"; Marshmello (featuring Khalid) – "Silence"; Zedd and Liam Payne – "Get Low"
Best Rock	Video with a Message
Imagine Dragons – "Whatever It Takes"; Fall Out Boy – "Champion"; Foo Fighters – "The Sky Is a Neighborhood"; Linkin Park – "One More Light"; Panic! at the Disco – "Say Amen (Saturday Night)"; Thirty Seconds to Mars – "Walk on Water"	Childish Gambino – "This Is America"; Drake – "God's Plan"; Dej Loaf and Leon Bridges – "Liberated"; Logic (featuring Alessia Cara and Khalid) – "1-800-273-8255"; Janelle Monáe (featuring Grimes) – "Pynk"; Jessie Reyez – "Gatekeeper"
Best Art Direction	Best Choreography
The Carters – "Apeshit" (Art Directors: Jan Houllevigue and the Louvre); Childish Gambino – "This Is America" (Art Director: Jason Kisvarday); J. Cole – "ATM" (Art Director: Miles Mullin); Janelle Monáe – "Make Me Feel" (Art Director: Pepper Nguyen); Taylor Swift – "Look What You Made Me Do" (Art Director: Brett Hess); SZA – "The Weekend" (Art Directors: SZA and Solange)	Childish Gambino – "This Is America" (Choreographer: Sherrie Silver); Camila Cabello (featuring Young Thug) – "Havana" (Choreographers: Calvit Hodge, Sara Bivens and Galen Hooks); The Carters – "Apeshit" (Choreographers: Sidi Larbi Cherkaoui and JaQuel Knight); Dua Lipa – "IDGAF" (Choreographer: Marion Motin); Bruno Mars (featuring Cardi B) – "Finesse (Remix)" (Choreographers: Phil Tayag and Bruno Mars); Justin Timberlake – "Filthy" (Choreographers: Marty Kudelka, AJ Harpold, Tracey Phillips and Ivan Koumaev)
Best Visual Effects	Best Editing
Kendrick Lamar and SZA – "All the Stars" (Visual Effects: Loris Paillier at BUF Paris); Avicii (featuring Rita Ora) – "Lonely Together" (Visual Effects: KPP); Eminem (featuring Beyoncé) – "Walk on Water" (Visual Effects: Rich Lee for Drive Studios); Ariana Grande – "No Tears Left to Cry" (Visual Effects: Vidal and Loris Paillier at BUF Paris); Maroon 5 – "Wait" (Visual Effects: Timber); Taylor Swift – "Look What You Made Me Do" (Visual Effects: Ingenuity Studios)	N.E.R.D and Rihanna – "Lemon" (Editor: Taylor Ward); The Carters – "Apeshit" (Editors: Taylor Ward and Sam Ostrove); Childish Gambino – "This Is America" (Editor: Ernie Gilbert); Bruno Mars (featuring Cardi B) – "Finesse (Remix)" (Editor: Jacquelyn London); Janelle Monáe – "Make Me Feel" (Editor: Deji Laray); Taylor Swift – "Look What You Made Me Do" (Editor: Chancler Haynes for Cosmo)
Best Cinematography	Best Direction
The Carters – "Apeshit" (Director of Photography: Benoît Debie); Alessia Cara – "Growing Pains" (Director of Photography: Pau Castejón); Childish Gambino – "This Is America" (Director of Photography: Larkin Seiple); Eminem (featuring Ed Sheeran) – "River" (Directors of Photography: Frank Mobilio and Patrick Meller); Ariana Grande – "No Tears Left to Cry" (Director of Photography: Scott Cunningham); Shawn Mendes – "In My Blood" (Director of Photography: Jonathan Sela)	Childish Gambino – "This Is America" (Director: Hiro Murai); The Carters – "Apeshit" (Director: Ricky Saix); Drake – "God's Plan" (Director: Karena Evans); Shawn Mendes – "In My Blood" (Director: Jay Martin); Ed Sheeran – "Perfect" (Director: Jason Koenig); Justin Timberlake (featuring Chris Stapleton) – "Say Something" (Director: Arturo Perez Jr.)
Song of Summer	Michael Jackson Video Vanguard Award
Cardi B, Bad Bunny and J Balvin – "I Like It"; DJ Khaled (featuring Justin Bieber, Chance the Rapper and Quavo) – "No Brainer"; Drake – "In My Feelings"; Calvin Harris and Dua Lipa – "One Kiss"; Juice Wrld – "Lucid Dreams"; Ella Mai – "Boo'd Up"; Post Malone – "Better Now"; Maroon 5 (featuring Cardi B) – "Girls Like You"	Jennifer Lopez

== Artists with multiple wins and nominations ==
Artists who received multiple awards
Wins	Artist
3	Childish Gambino
3	Cardi B
2	Camila Cabello
2	The Carters
2	J Balvin
2	Jennifer Lopez

Artists who received multiple nominations
Nominations	Artist
12	Cardi B
8	The Carters
8	Drake
7	Childish Gambino
6	Bruno Mars
5	Ariana Grande
5	Camila Cabello
4	Dua Lipa
4	Ed Sheeran
4	Khalid
4	Young Thug
3	Alessia Cara
3	DJ Khaled
3	Janelle Monáe
3	Post Malone
3	Shawn Mendes
3	SZA
3	Taylor Swift
2	Chloe x Halle
2	Hayley Kiyoko
2	Jennifer Lopez
2	DJ Khaled
2	Logic
2	N.E.R.D
2	Rihanna
2	Jessie Reyez
2	Demi Lovato
2	21 Savage
2	J Balvin
2	J. Cole
2	Eminem
2	Maluma
2	Avicii
2	Rita Ora
2	Calvin Harris
2	Justin Timberlake
2	Maroon 5

== Music Videos with multiple wins and nominations ==
Music Videos that received multiple awards
Wins	Artist(s)	Music Video
3	Childish Gambino	"This Is America"
2	The Carters	"Apeshit"

Music Videos that received multiple nominations
Nominations	Artist(s)	Music Video
8	The Carters	"Apeshit"
7	Childish Gambino	"This Is America"
5	Bruno Mars (featuring Cardi B)	"Finesse (Remix)"
5	Drake	"God's Plan"
4	Ariana Grande	"No Tears Left to Cry"
4	Camila Cabello (featuring Young Thug)	"Havana"
3	Ed Sheeran	"Perfect"
3	Shawn Mendes	"In My Blood"
3	Taylor Swift	"Look What You Made Me Do"
2	Avicii (featuring Rita Ora)	"Lonely Together"
2	Calvin Harris and Dua Lipa	"One Kiss"
2	Janelle Monáe	"Make Me Feel"
2	J. Cole	"ATM"
2	Jennifer Lopez (featuring DJ Khaled and Cardi B)	"Dinero"
2	Logic (featuring Alessia Cara and Khalid)	"1-800-273-8255"
2	N.E.R.D and Rihanna	"Lemon"

== Critical reception ==
Entertainment Weekly's writer Darren Franich gave the show a B− and said, "MTV's tagline for the 2018 Video Music Awards was 'Everything might happen.' Hey, they said might. The 35th VMAs had some fiery performances, but the show never quite sparked [...] This was a reasonably satisfying awards show, not the boring trainwreck some VMAs have been, not the exciting trainwreck supernova some VMAs dare to be." For Variety, Daniel D'addario said, "There was a time when the VMAs were a change-of-season status report on pop: As MTV’s target audience heads back to school and those slightly outside that audience get ready to turn their mind to graver things, the pop world had historically united to put on a show that could carry viewers into the fall." and unfavorably compared it to the 2013 show line up. In Billboard, Leila Cobo wrote, "although this year's awards haven't escaped criticism, it hasn't been for lack of Latin power," noting that "Maluma, Cardi B, Jennifer Lopez and Camila Cabello (finally) put Latin music center stage at VMAs."

== Gallery ==
Award ceremony gallery
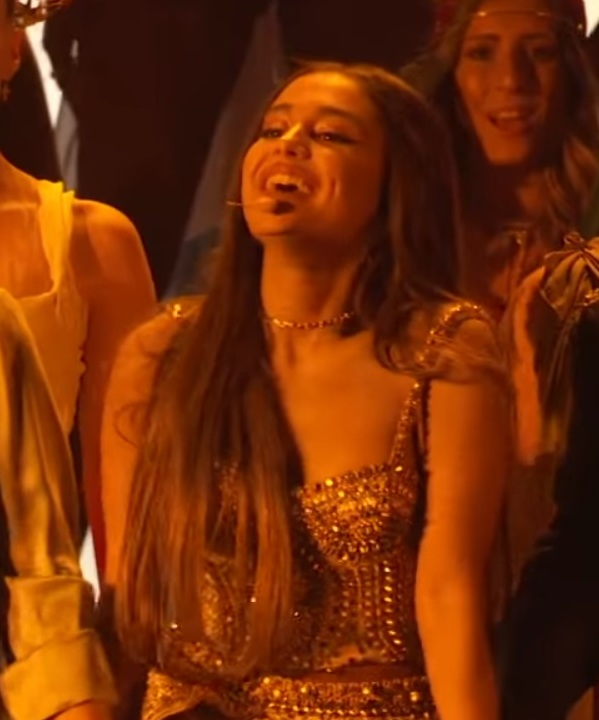
Ariana Grande

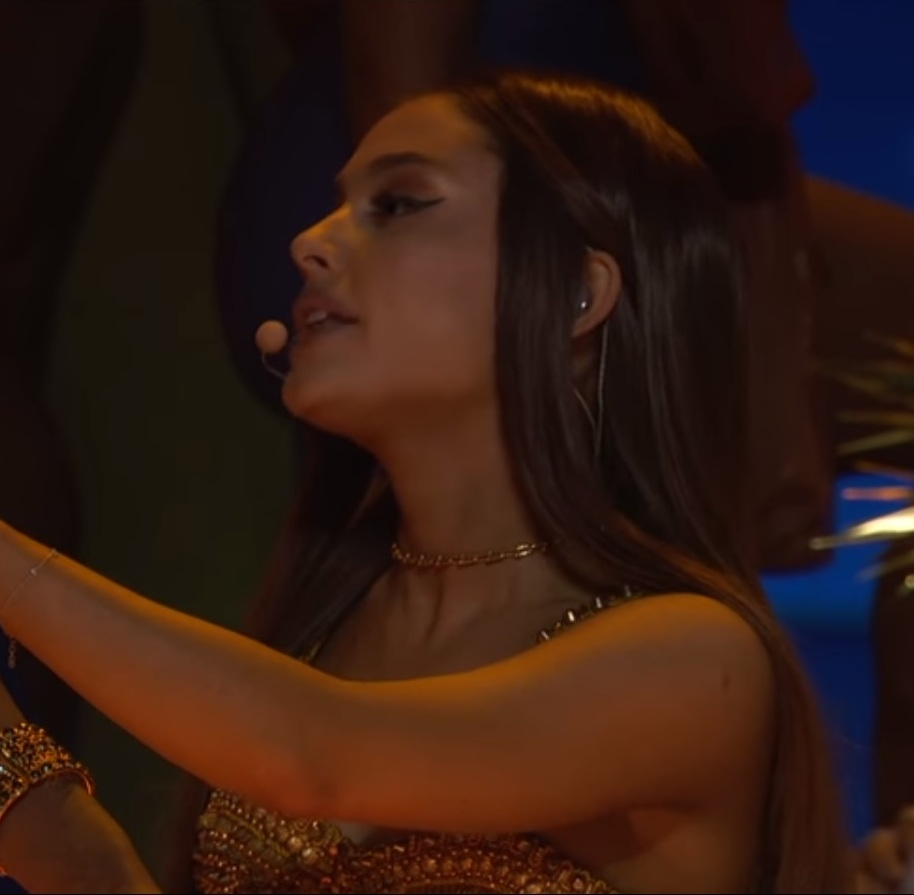
Ariana Grande performing "God is a Woman"

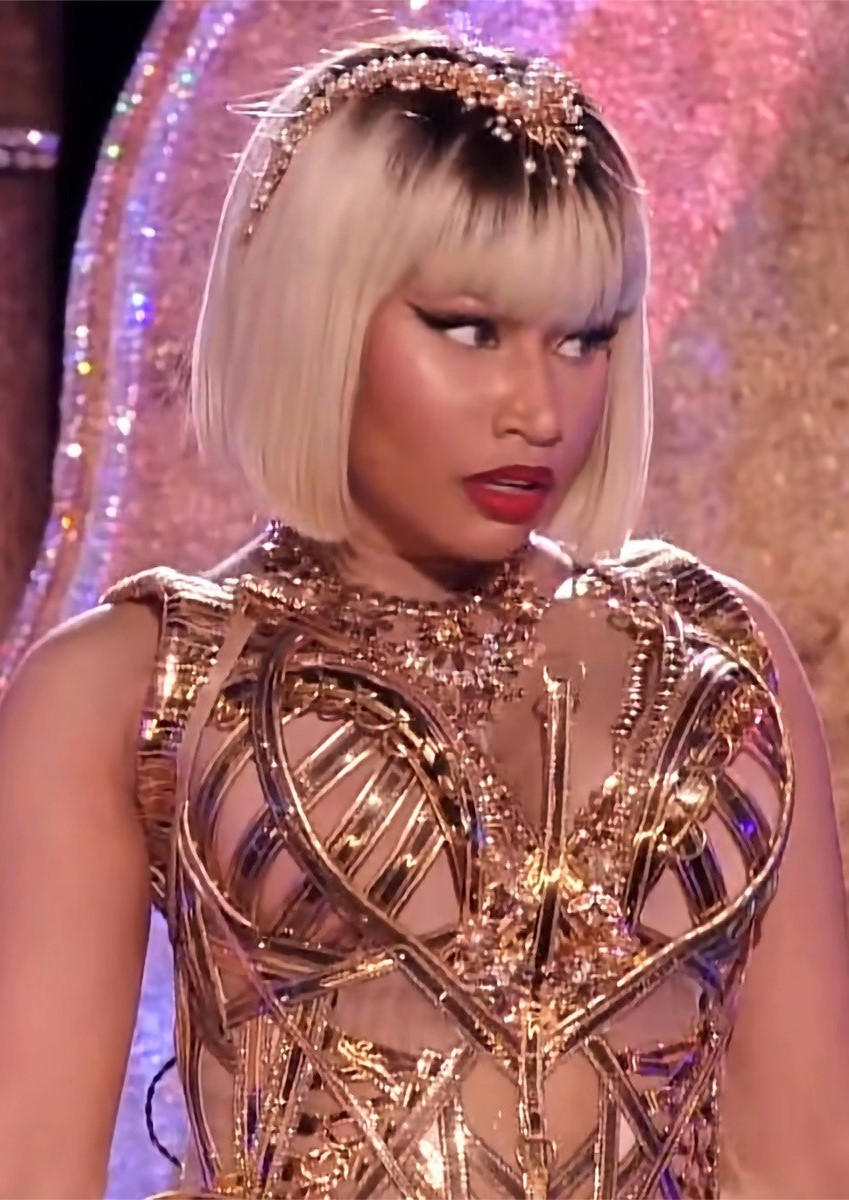
Nicki Minaj

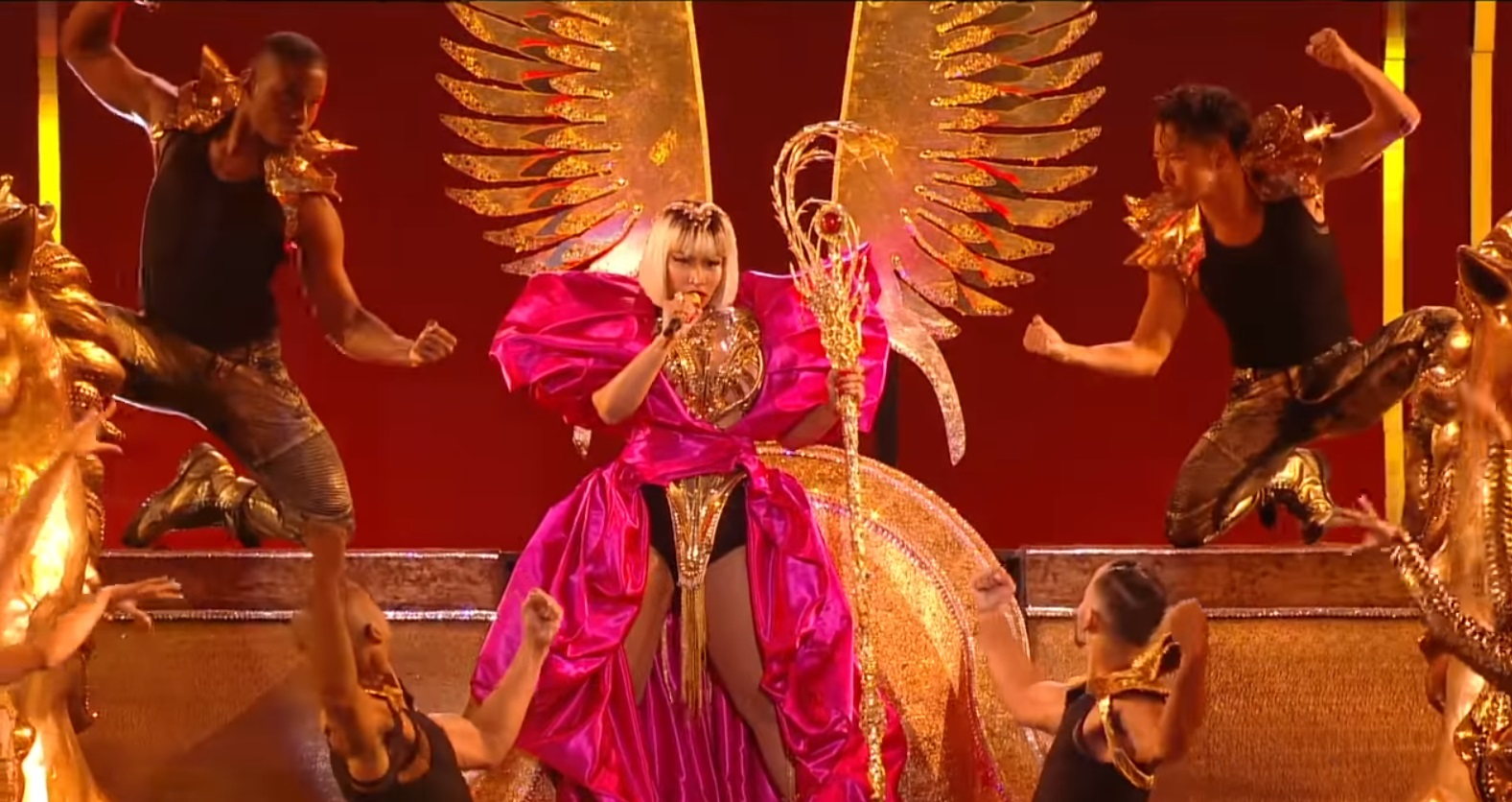
Nicki Minaj's performance

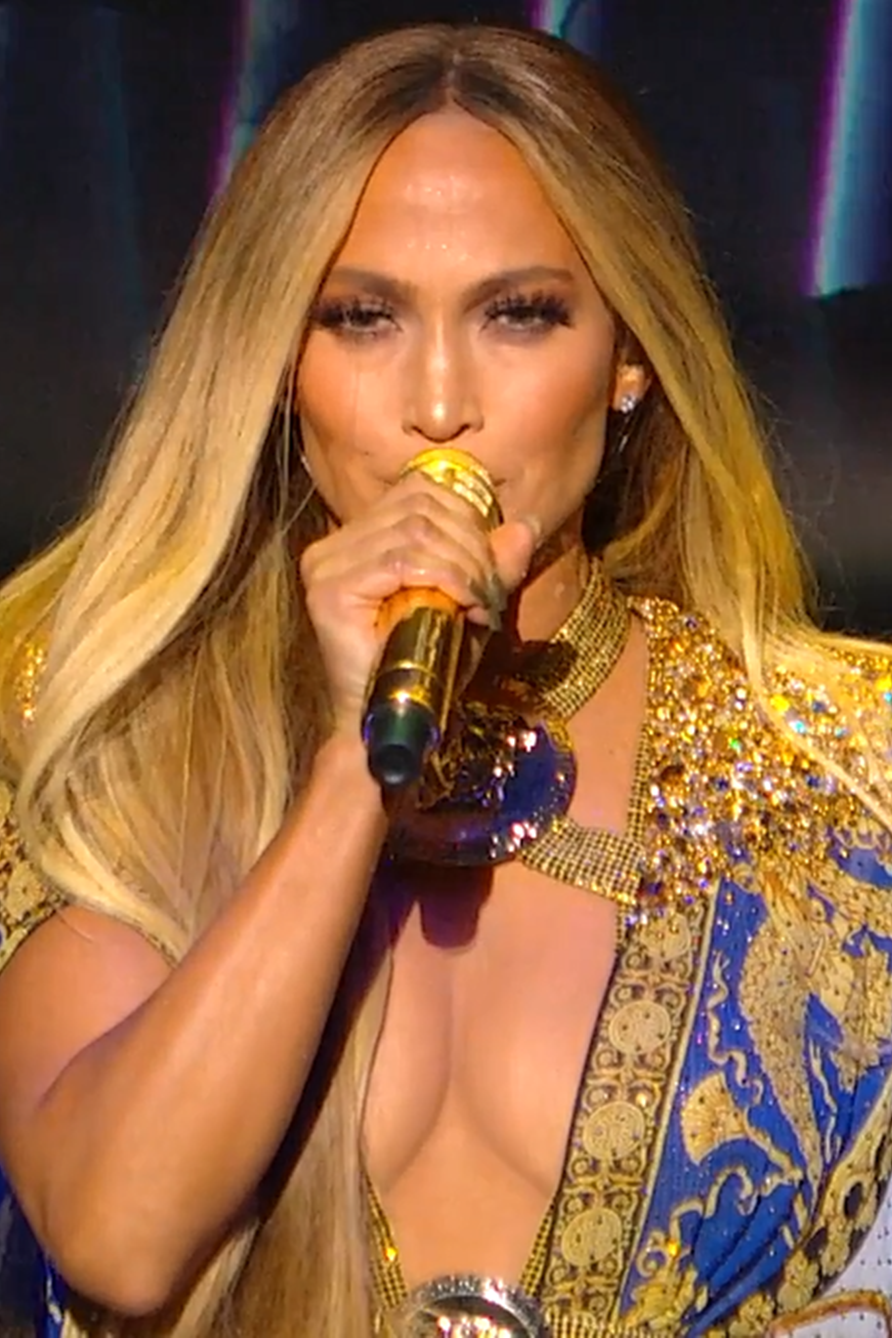
Jennifer Lopez

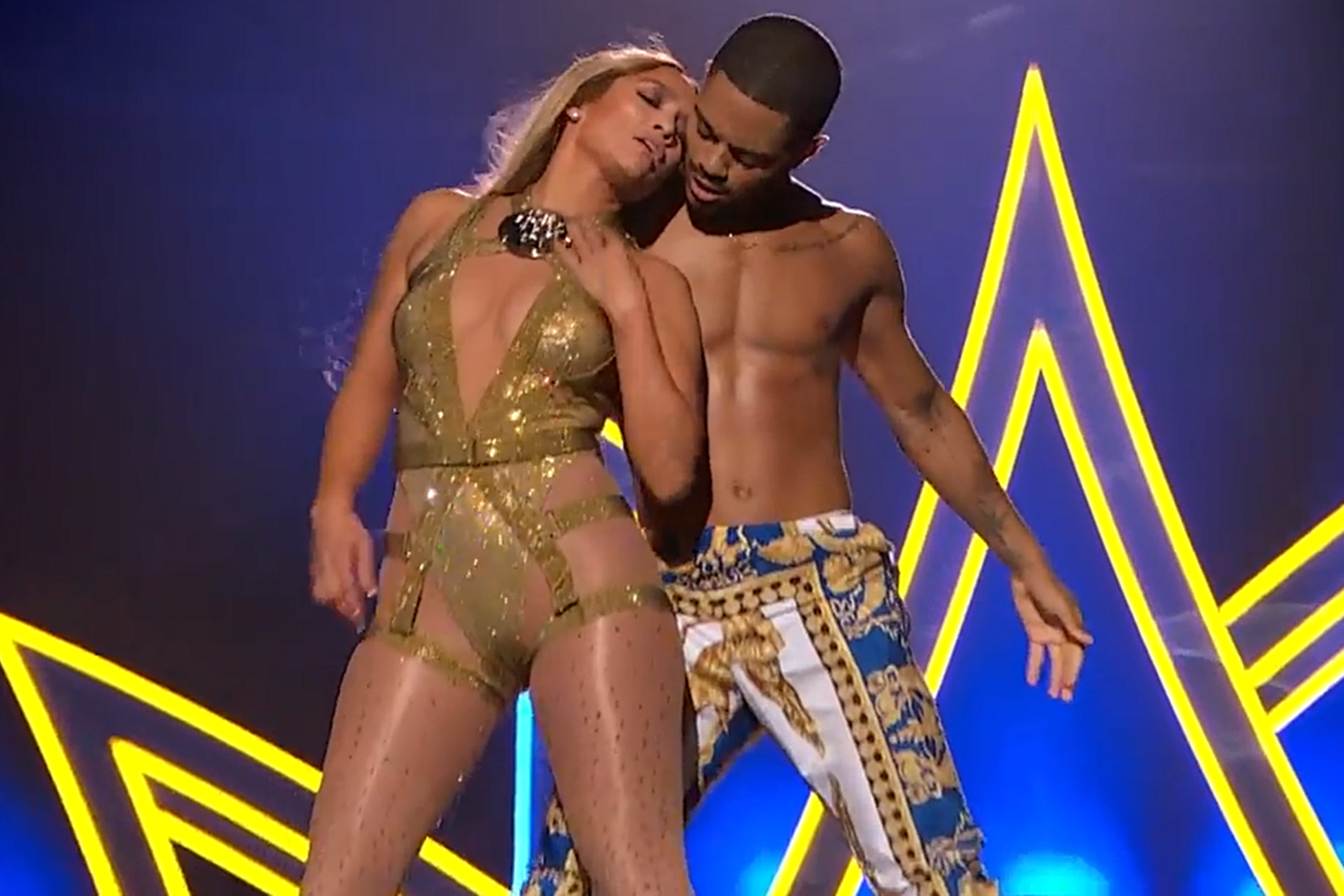
Jennifer Lopez's performance

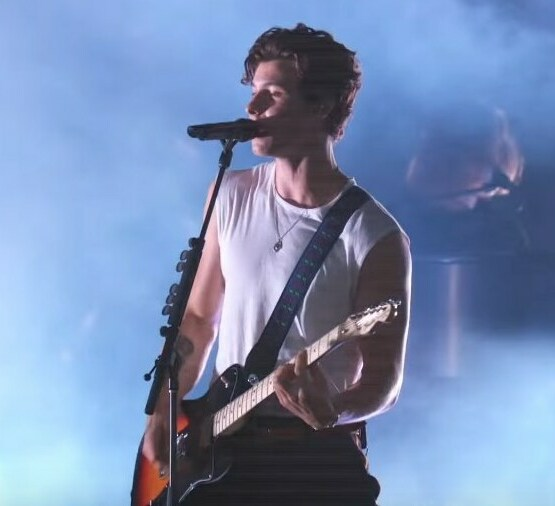
Shawn Mendes

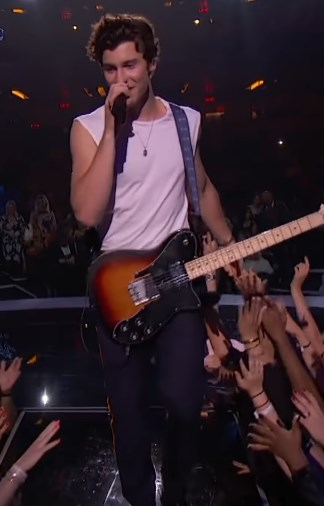
Shawn Mendes performing "In My Blood"

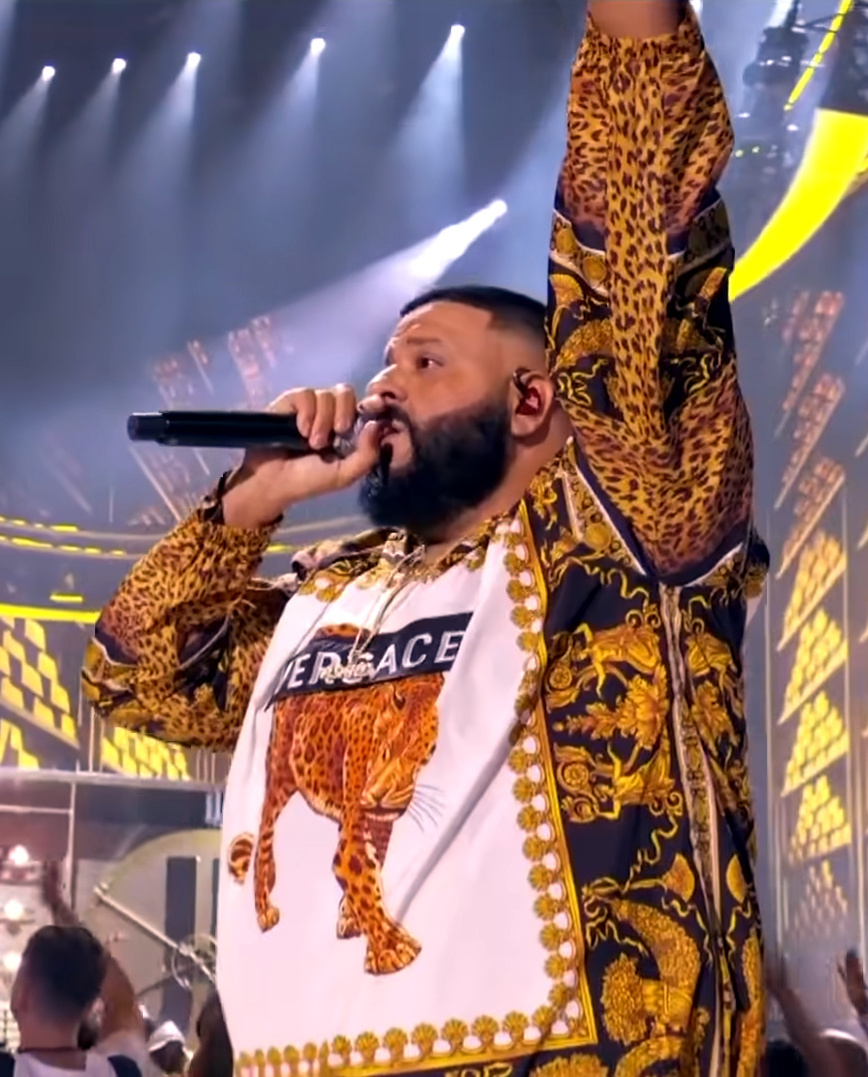
DJ Khaled

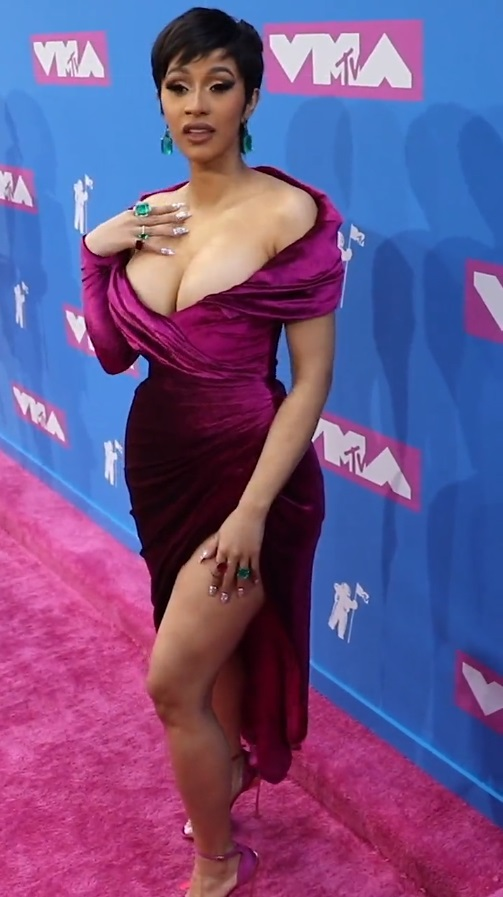
Cardi B

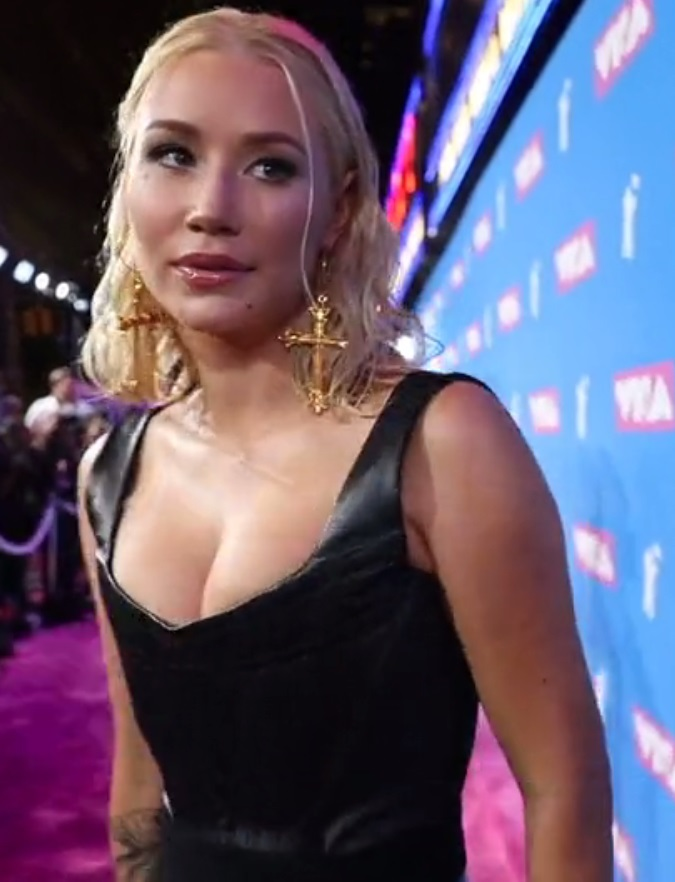
Iggy Azalea

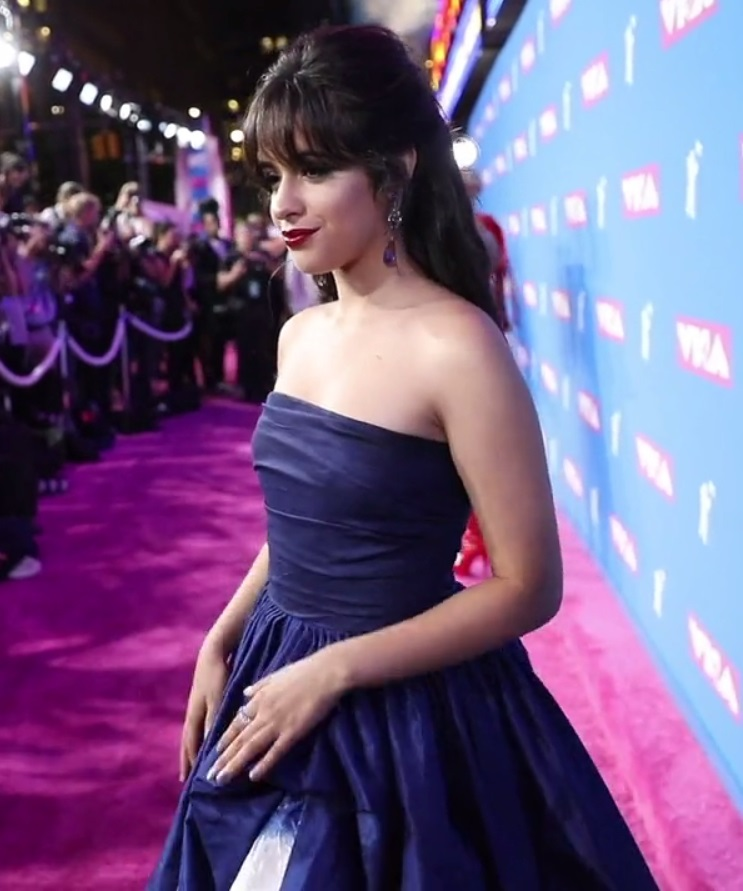
Camila Cabello

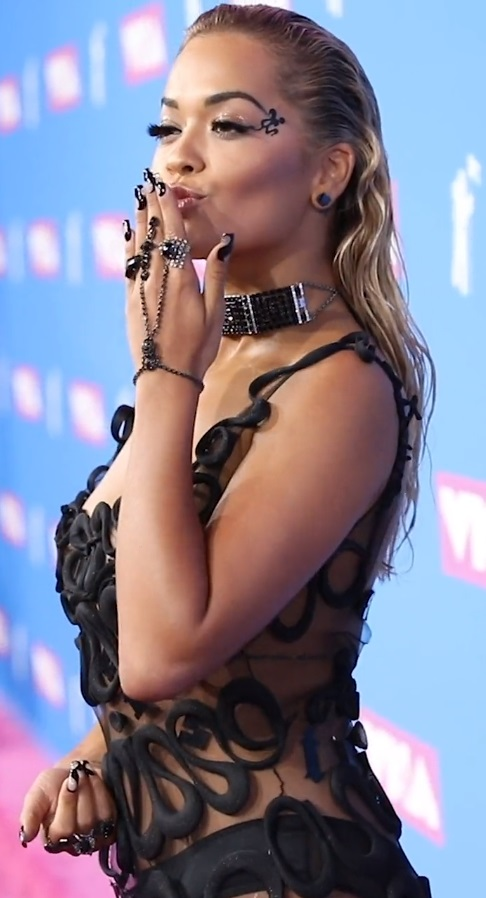
Rita Ora

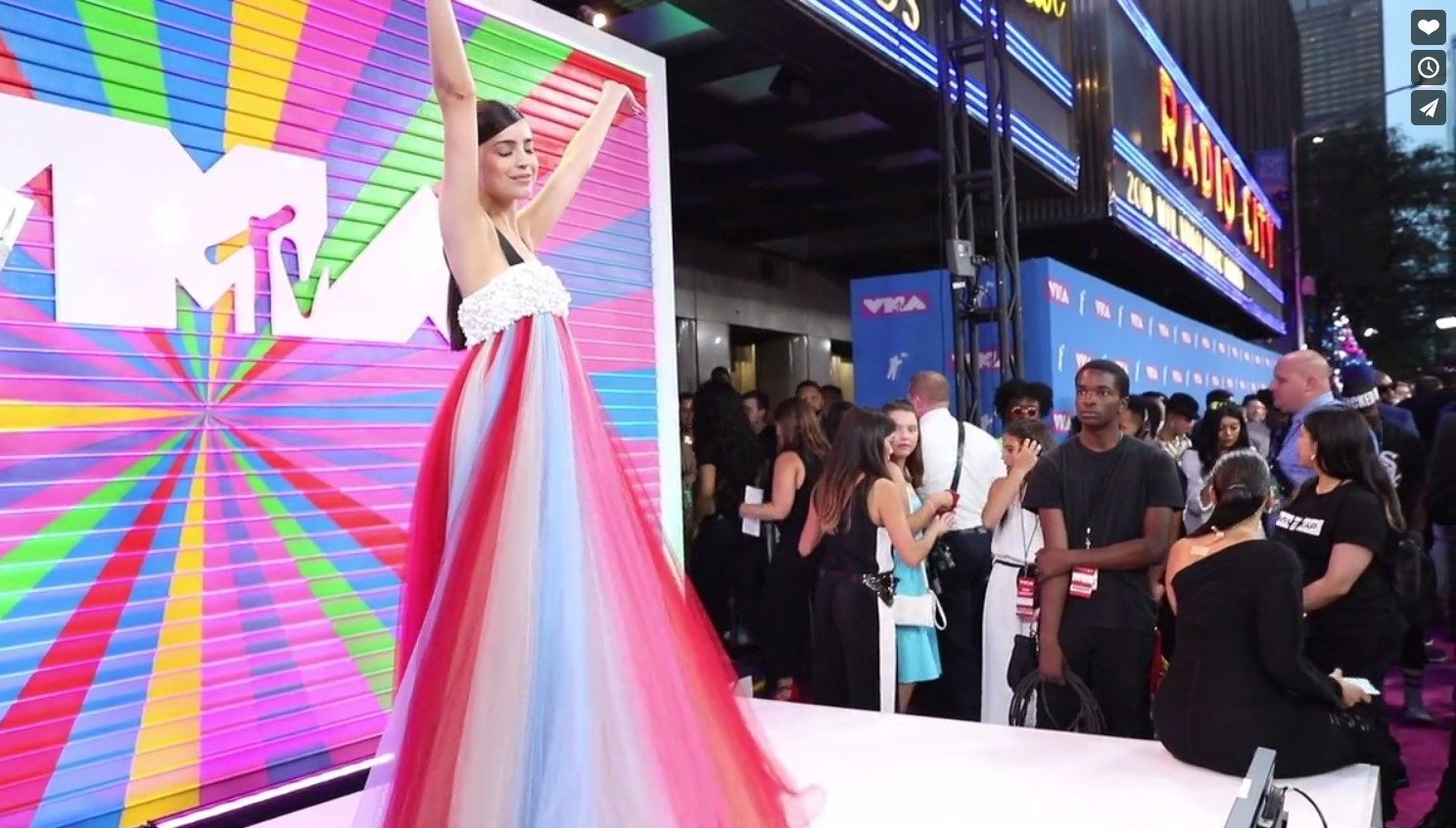
Sofia Carson

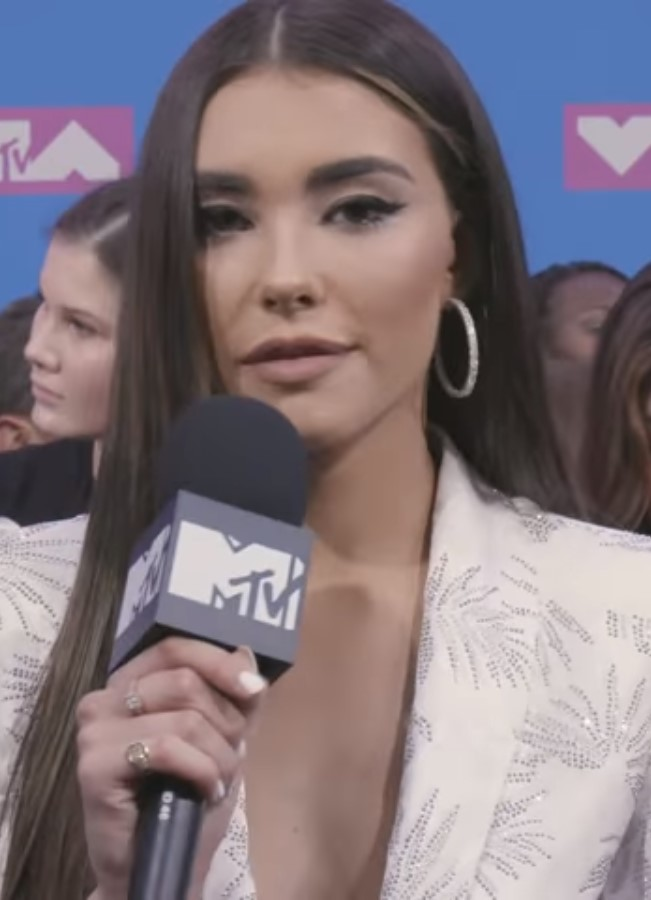
Madison Beer

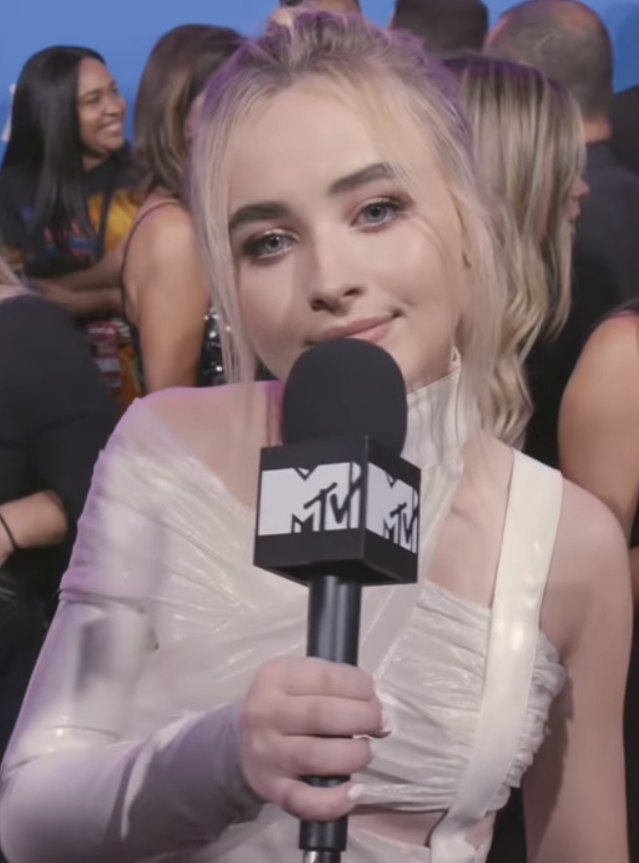
Sabrina Carpenter

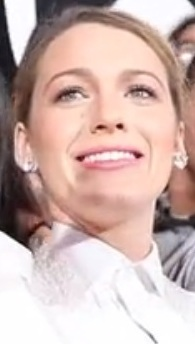
Blake Lively

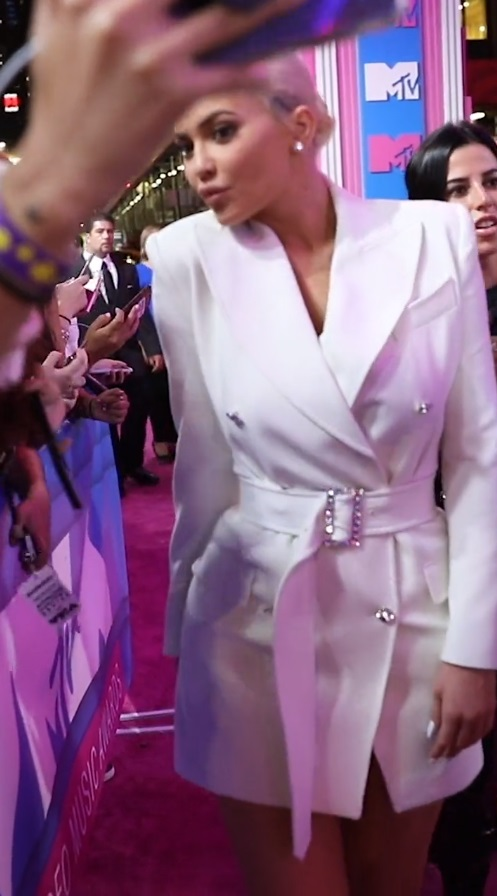
Kylie Jenner

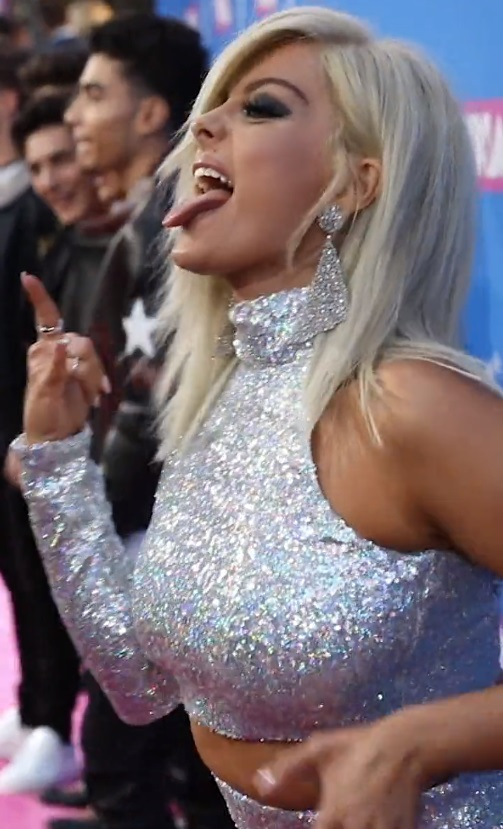
Bebe Rexha

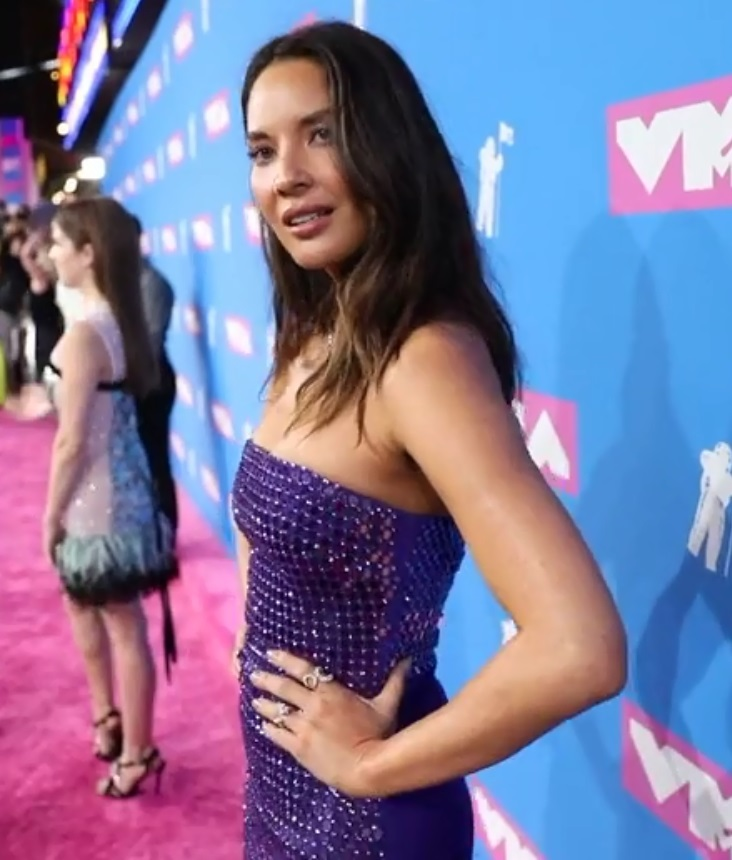
Olivia Munn

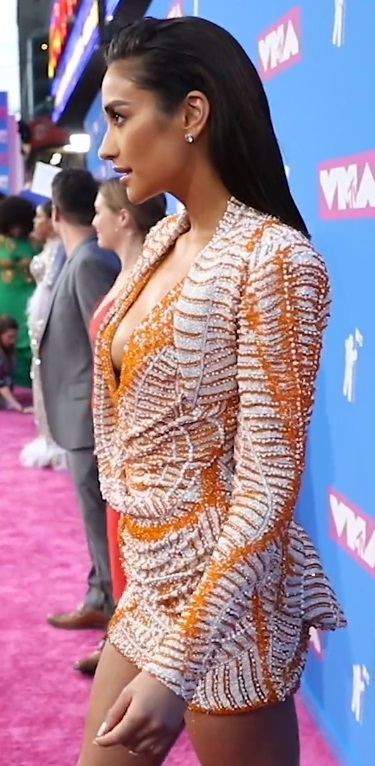
Shay Mitchell

== See also ==
- 2018 MTV Europe Music Awards
