= Dinero (Jennifer Lopez song) =

Single by Jennifer Lopez featuring DJ Khaled and Cardi B
- Language: English; Spanish
- English title: "Money"
- Released: May 17, 2018
- Recorded: 2017
- Genre: Latin trap
- Length: 3:33
- Label: Epic
- Songwriters: Charles Anderson; Tommy Brown; Alexander Prado; Jermaine Denny; Khaled Khaled; Belcalis Almanzar; Luis Kalaff
- Producers: Tommy Brown; DJ Khaled

Jennifer Lopez singles chronology
"El Anillo" (2018)	"Dinero" (2018)	"Te Guste" (2018)

DJ Khaled singles chronology
"I Believe" (2018)	"Dinero" (2018)	"No Brainer" (2018)

Cardi B singles chronology
"Girls" (2018)	"Dinero" (2018)	"I Like It" (2018)

Music video
- "Dinero" on YouTube

"Dinero" (English: "Money") is a song by American singer Jennifer Lopez featuring American record producer DJ Khaled and American rapper Cardi B. It was written by Charles Anderson, Tommy Brown, Mohombi Moupondo, Alexander Prado, Jermaine Denny, DJ Khaled, Cardi B and Luis Kalaff, and produced by DJ Khaled and Tommy Brown. "Dinero" was released on all digital and streaming platforms on May 17, 2018, by Epic Records. The song was nominated for Choice Latin Song at the 2018 Teen Choice Awards and its official music video received two nominations for Best Latin Video and Best Collaboration at the 2018 MTV Video Music Awards, winning the latter. The song reached number one in Puerto Rico.

== Background ==
"Dinero" is Lopez's first English single since "Us". Lopez first heard "Dinero" in early 2017 when it was sent to her by Cory Rooney, a record producer with whom she had worked frequently in her early career, who felt that it would be good for her. She was receptive of the track, and in the months that followed suggested to her manager Benny Medina that rapper Cardi B be featured on the record. Lopez, who had followed Cardi B prior to her breakthrough with "Bodak Yellow", said: "I just thought she had a street intelligence that I liked, and she had a logic that just made me laugh and reminded me of girls from the Bronx." Later, record producer DJ Khaled offered to provide further production for "Dinero", and the song was finished by December 2017. That month, a video of Lopez and Khaled working together in the studio was posted to Instagram, which hinted that the singer had collaborated with Cardi B. A short snippet of the song surfaced online in January 2018, and Lopez subsequently confirmed that it was titled "Dinero" the following month. Khaled stated: "Everything's top secret, [but] I can tell you this: J.Lo's got some new music coming [...] I want to thank J.Lo for letting me be one of the producers amongst other great ones, and a feature on the record. I'm grateful."

== Composition ==
"Dinero" is a Latin trap song with a production that consists of synths, drums and an "occasional" acoustic guitar lick. "Dinero", which translates in English to "Money", features Lopez rapping. Lopez opens the song with the introduction: "Me and Benjamín Franco stay at the banco / Getting checks like Nike, everywhere that I go", and in the hook declares: "Yo quiero, yo quiero dinero" ("I want, I want money"). Cardi B's verse includes the lyric: "Two bad bitches that came from the Bronx / Cardi from the pole and Jenny from the block", a reference to the Bronx, where both Lopez and Cardi originate from, and Cardi's former stripper career. Khaled can be heard throughout the track, acting as a hype man.

== Critical reception ==
Abby Jones of Billboard described "Dinero" as a "fiery proclamation of everyone's love for cold hard cash that's brimming with witty bilingual word play." The Guardian characterized the song as "a hustler's anthem", adding: "And not to mention the fact that J-Lo raps on this song with, 'They say money talk, but my talking bilingual', as her best bar." Similarly, XXL called it a "fiery anthem" and "potential banger". Vogue writer Michelle Ruiz praised the song as a potential summer hit, and felt that "Dinero" is "sort of like the 2018 answer" to Lopez's 2002 lead single from her third studio album titled This Is Me... Then, "Jenny from the Block".

== Music video ==
=== Official video ===
The music video for "Dinero" was shot in April 2018. In the clip that surfaced online in December 2017, Lopez and Khaled could be heard discussing a concept for the video, with Khaled noting that "The video idea is gonna make the record even more crazier." Lopez said: "It's cinematic. It has those themes. I was just trying to connect it to the song where it's just not the typical reggaeton, bachata, hip-hop video that everybody does all the time." Directed by Joseph Kahn, the music video was shot entirely in black-and-white. It was released on May 24, 2018. Lopez sported 13 different looks and wore US$4.5 million worth of jewelry from Tiffany & Co.

Slant Magazine listed "Dinero" as one of the "100 Best Music Videos of the 2010s", with Alexa Camp writing that, "the black-and-white clip brazenly takes the piss out of Lopez’s dubious Jenny from the Block persona—and she’s clearly in on the joke, bowling with a diamond-covered ball, barbecuing in lingerie and pearls while sipping a crystal-encrusted Slurpee, toasting marshmallows over a burning pile of cash, and walking a preening pet ostrich on a leash."

=== Alternate video ===
An alternate versions of the video, a vertical video directed by Steven Gomillion, was released exclusively on Spotify, on June 12, 2018. In the video, Lopez cruises through Las Vegas in a convertible, lip-syncing along to the song.

== Live performances ==
Lopez first previewed the song during her set at Calibash in January 2018, which took place at the Staples Center in Los Angeles. She included it as part of a dance medley with "Bitch Better Have My Money" by Rihanna and "Bodak Yellow" by Cardi B. Lopez officially performed "Dinero" for the first time at the 2018 Billboard Music Awards which took place at the MGM Grand Garden Arena on May 20. She wore a "bedazzled" bustier and white pants, later sporting a white blazer and fedora to complete the look. She was surrounded by a group of "'40s era gangster-styled dancers". Khaled, surrounded by piles of money, appeared on a separate stage to introduce Lopez; Cardi B was not present due to her pregnancy, but appeared via a black-and-white video. Leila Cobo of Billboard said the performance was "ridiculously fun to watch", calling it "a lot of bling, a lot of style, some kick-ass dancing (JLo does not disappoint) and a whole lotta cash flying around". Refinery29 writer Kathryn Lindsay stated that "the multi-hyphenate proved she's going back to her roots with a passionate and colorful performance", but noted: "The one thing people didn't like about the performance? DJ Khaled. The artist was there, seemingly, to throw around money and yell some of his signature phrases during the song, but fans just wanted more J.Lo." Lopez and Khaled later performed "Dinero" as part of Lopez's medley during the 2018 MTV Video Music Awards on August 20, 2018, at Radio City Music Hall in New York City, where she was also awarded the Michael Jackson Video Vanguard Award. Lopez performed the song for Today, at Rockefeller Plaza on May 6, 2019, in New York City as part of the shows Citi Concert Series. Lopez was the opening act and kicked off the event performing the song as part of a medley that also included "Medicine" (2019), "Jenny from the Block" (2002) and "On the Floor" (2011).

== Personnel ==
Credits adapted from Tidal.

- Scott Desmarais – production
- Tommy Brown – production
- Mohombi Moupondo – co-production
- Khaled Khaled – production, vocals
- Yei Gonzalez – co-production
- Belcalis Almanzar – vocals
- Manny Marroquin – mix engineering
- Jennifer Lopez – vocals
- Robin Florent – engineering assistance
- Scott Desmarals – production assistance
- Trevor Muzzy – record engineering
- Juan "AyoJuan" Peña – record engineering
- Cory Rooney - executive production
- Eric "eDoubleMUSIC" Erickson - record engineering

== Charts ==
Weekly chart performance for "Dinero"
Chart (2018)	Peak position
Belgium (Ultratip Bubbling Under Wallonia)	12
Canada Hot 100 (Billboard)	75
Canada CHR/Top 40 (Billboard)	48
Dominican Republic (SodinPro)	13
France (SNEP)	140
Greece International (IFPI)	40
Mexico Ingles Airplay (Billboard)	38
Panama Anglo (Monitor Latino)	16
Poland Dance (ZPAV)	33
Puerto Rico (Monitor Latino)	1
Romania (Airplay 100)	72
US Billboard Hot 100	80
US Dance Airplay (Billboard)	38
US Pop Airplay (Billboard)	26
US Rhythmic Airplay (Billboard)	36
US Latin Airplay (Billboard)	1

== Certifications ==
Certifications and sales for "Dinero"
Region	Certification	Certified units/sales
United States (RIAA)	Gold	500,000^{‡}
^{‡} Sales+streaming figures based on certification alone.

== Release history ==
Release dates for "Dinero"
Region	Date	Format	Label	Ref.
Various	May 17, 2018	Digital download; streaming	Epic	
United States	May 22, 2018	Rhythmic contemporary	Epic	
Italy	June 1, 2018	Contemporary hit radio	Sony	

== See also ==
- List of Billboard Hot Latin Songs and Latin Airplay number ones of 2018
