= Jennifer Lopez Presents: Como Ama una Mujer =

- Genre: Drama
- Based on: Como Ama una Mujer by Jennifer Lopez
- Written by: Lina Uribe; Ximena Escalante; Jimena Romero
- Directed by: Antonio Serrano
- Country of origin: Mexico
- Original language: Spanish
- No. of episodes: 5

Production
- Executive producers: Jennifer Lopez; Simon Fields; Antonio Serrano
- Producers: Aida Bernal; Lorenzo O'Brien
- Cinematography: Héctor Ortega
- Editor: Roberto Bolado
- Running time: 240 minutes
- Production company: Nuyorican

Original release
- Network: Univision
- Release: October 30 – November 27, 2007

Jennifer Lopez Presents: Como Ama una Mujer, simply referred to as Como Ama una Mujer, is an American five-part miniseries based on the lyrics from the Jennifer Lopez album of the same name. It aired on the Univision Television Network in the fall of 2007. At the end of each episode, Lopez performs the theme song that inspired that episode. The five episodes were released as a two disc DVD set on December 18, 2007, in the United States.

== Cast and characters ==
Cast credits and character bios via official press release:

- Leonor Varela portrays Sofia, the main protagonist in the miniseries. She is a famous singer and actress whose rise to superstardom happened overnight. She finds her private life to be constantly under attack by the paparazzi.
- Raúl Méndez portrays Diego, someone from Sofia's past who has plans for her future.
- Cristián de la Fuente portrays Andres, Sofia's fiancé and a soccer superstar.
- Gabriela de la Garza portrays Laura, a socialite and fashion designer. She is Diego's jealous girlfriend.
- Rebecca Jones portrays Barbara, Andres' publicist.
- Rocío Verdejo portrays Adriana, Sofia's envious friend and assistant.
- Martin Altomaro portrays Paco, Diego's friend and confidant.
- Josefo Rodriguez portrays Fernando, Sofia's manager. He offers her wise advice and knows her better than she knows herself.
- Karoll Marquez portrays Nicolas, Sophie's brother.
- Luis Fernando Padilla portrays Felipe, Andres' best friend and soccer teammate.

== Episodes ==
- Sola – October 30, 2007
- Tú – November 6, 2007
- Por Qué Te Marchas – November 13, 2007
- Como Ama una Mujer – November 20, 2007
- Por Arriesgarnos – November 27, 2007
