= Se Acabó el Amor =

Single by Abraham Mateo, Yandel and Jennifer Lopez

from the album A Cámara Lenta
- Language: Spanish
- English title: "The Love Is Over"
- Released: 9 March 2018
- Genre: Reggaeton; dancehall; latin pop
- Length: 3:50 (urban version)
- Label: Sony España
- Songwriters: Mateo; Achraf Jannusi; Bilal Hajji; Lopez; Jimmy Thörnfeldt; Jorge Martínez Gómez; José Carlos García; Llandel Veguilla Malavé; Luis O'Neill; Marcos Masis; Ramon Lavado Martinez; Víctor Viera Moore
- Producers: Mateo; Tainy; Jumbo “El Que Produce Solo”; Lopez; Thörnfeldt; Gómez; García; Malavé; O'Neill

Abraham Mateo singles chronology
"Háblame Bajito" (2017)	"Se Acabó el Amor" (2018)	"Bailotéame" (2018)

Yandel singles chronology
"Como Antes" (2017)	"Se Acabó el Amor" (2018)	"Mira" (2018)

Jennifer Lopez singles chronology
"Us" (2018)	"Se Acabó el Amor" (2018)	"El Anillo" (2018)

Music video
- "Se Acabó el Amor" on YouTube

"Se Acabó El Amor" (English: "The Love Is Over") is a song recorded by Spanish singer Abraham Mateo with Puerto Rican singer Yandel and American singer and entertainer Jennifer Lopez. It was released on March 9, 2018, through Sony Music, as the third single from Mateo's fifth studio album A camara lenta. It was written by Abraham Mateo and Cuban artist "El Chacal", and produced by urban music producers Jumbo, I am Chino & Jorgie, Tainy and Oneil.

== Track listings ==
- Digital download
1. "Se Acabó el Amor" (urban version) – 3:50

== Chart performance ==
In June 2018, "Se Acabó el Amor" reached number one on the US Latin Airplay chart, becoming Mateo's first, Yandel's eleventh and Lopez's seventh song to top the chart.

== Music video ==
The music video for "Se Acabó El Amor" was shot on 8 March 2018 at the Universal Studios in Hollywood, Los Angeles under the direction by Daniel Durán. The music video premiered on Friday 20 April, and generated 120 million views in three weeks.

== Charts ==
Chart (2018)	Peak position
Argentina (Argentina Hot 100)	93
Dominican Republic Pop (Monitor Latino)	5
Ecuador (National-Report)	79
Mexico Espanol Airplay (Billboard)	30
Spain (PROMUSICAE)	64
Switzerland (Schweizer Hitparade)	83
US Hot Latin Songs (Billboard)	19
US Latin Airplay (Billboard)	1
Venezuela (National-Report)	74

== Certifications ==
Region	Certification	Certified units/sales
United States (RIAA)	Platinum (Latin)	60,000^{‡}
^{‡} Sales+streaming figures based on certification alone.

== See also ==
- List of Billboard number-one Latin songs of 2018
