= Laurel DeWitt =

Los Angeles fashion designer

- Education: Pratt Institute
- Occupation: Fashion designer
- Notable work: Beyonce’s crown in Hymn for the Weekend

Laurel DeWitt is an American fashion designer and artist based in Los Angeles. She designs and hand-crafts metal crowns and headdresses, metal apparels, art installations and performance pieces. Her custom pieces have been worn by numerous celebrities including Madonna, Jennifer Lopez, Normani, Cardi B, Mary J. Blige, Latto, Lady Gaga and Khloé Kardashian.

== Education ==
DeWitt grew up in New York and graduated from the Brooklyn campus of Pratt Institute in 2005.

== Fashion career ==
In her early career, DeWitt worked as a handbag designer in New York for Kenneth Cole Reaction, Oscar de la Renta, Juicy Couture, Michael Kors and Calvin Klein.

She made her first crown for the Smithsonian Institution of African Arts. Her most notable work was creating the flower crown for Beyonce in Coldplay’s 2015 music video, Hymn for the Weekend. She used raw metal sheets of aluminum, brass and steel, cut the sheets into flower petals and hand-painted them with a special ink to make the 25 flowers. She has also designed a skirt for Ariana Grande, a bone crown for Bebe Rexha, a gold turban for Kelly Rowland and a chain drape for Nicki Minaj among her other works for Hollywood celebrities and pop artists.

DeWitt moved to Los Angeles in 2017 when she expanded her business. In 2020, she designed the outfit for Rapper Saweetie in her music video, Back to The Streets. She had designed crowns for the cast of the 2021 film, Coming 2 America.

DeWitt has also worked on projects for The Brooklyn Museum, Macy’s Herald Square, the Smithsonian Institution, and Madame Tussaud's Wax Museum. She has produced collections for several New York Fashion Week and Los Angeles Fashion Week featured showcases.
