= Love Make the World Go Round =

Single by Jennifer Lopez and Lin-Manuel Miranda
- Released: July 8, 2016
- Recorded: June 27, 2016
- Studio: Avatar (New York, New York)
- Genre: Dance
- Length: 3:56
- Label: Epic
- Songwriters: Jennifer Lopez; Lin-Manuel Miranda; Mike Molina; Melody Noel Hernandez; John Mitchell; Nelson Kyle; Marcus Lomax; Jordan Johnson; Stefan Johnson
- Producers: The Agency; The Monsters & Strangerz

Jennifer Lopez singles chronology
"Ain't Your Mama" (2016)	"Love Make the World Go Round" (2016)	"Chegaste" (2016)

Lin-Manuel Miranda singles chronology
"Jabba Flow" (2016)	"Love Make the World Go Round" (2016)	"Almost Like Praying" (2017)

"Love Make the World Go Round" is a charity single recorded by American entertainer Jennifer Lopez and American composer Lin-Manuel Miranda. It was written by Lopez, Miranda, Mike Molina, Melody Noel Hernandez, John Mitchell, Nelson Kyle, Marcus Lomax, Jordan Johnson and Stefan Johnson, and produced by The Agency and The Monsters & Strangerz. The song was released exclusively on the iTunes Store in the United States on July 8, 2016, by Epic Records. All proceeds from "Love Make the World Go Round" were donated to the Hispanic Federation's Somos Orlando fund, which provided care and resources to the victims of the Orlando nightclub shooting.

== Background ==
Proceeds of the song will go toward the Hispanic Federation's Proyecto Somos Orlando initiative, which "will address the long-term needs for mental health services that are culturally competent and bilingual. Proyecto will enable care to be delivered to those affected directly in the communities in which they live. Beyond emergency assistance, they will be provided with case management, crisis intervention and mental health services, among other needs."

== Composition ==
"Love Make the World Go Round" is a dance song, with a length of three minutes and fifty-six seconds (3:56). It was written by Lopez, Miranda, Mike Molina, Melody Noel Hernandez, John Mitchell, Nelson Kyle, Marcus Lomax, Jordan Johnson and Stefan Johnson, and produced by The Agency and The Monsters & Strangerz. Background vocals performed by Candace Wakefield. The song features a dancehall-inspired, pop-infused beat with "lyrics calling for unity, compassion, understanding, and love in the face of darkness".

== Critical reception ==
Robbie Daw of Idolator gave the song eight out of ten stars, praising it as a "Worldly" and "inspiring" track with an "instantly catchy groove", while noting: "Snippets of Lin-Manuel Miranda's Tony acceptance sonnet are employed in such a way that the addition doesn’t feel forced. Plus, Lopez's vocals are top notch here." Another writer from the website, Rachel Sonis, added that "With its infectious, sun-kissed melody and uplifting lyrics of love and unity, this song makes light out of such a tragic time in human history. It's simple, hopeful and, ultimately, something we all desperately need right now."

== Chart performance ==
The single debuted at number 72 on the US Billboard Hot 100 and number 9 on the US Digital Songs chart, with 54,000 downloads sold in its first week. The song marks Miranda's first appearance on "Billboard" charts as a solo artist.

== Music video ==
On the same day of the single's release, Lopez and Miranda were spotted filming the music video of the song on the rooftop of the Richard Rodgers Theatre, the theater where Miranda's Broadway hit Hamilton plays.

On August 9, Lopez' premiered "the making" music video of the song through her official Facebook account.

== Live performances ==
Lopez and Miranda first performed the song on July 11, just three days after its release, on Today. The day after they both performed the song again on The Tonight Show Starring Jimmy Fallon.

== Charts ==
Chart (2016)	Peak position
US Billboard Hot 100	72
US Hot Digital Songs (Billboard)	9

== Release history ==
Country	Date	Format	Label
United States	July 8, 2016	Digital download	Epic
