= Chegaste =

2016 single by Jennifer Lopez and Roberto Carlos

Single by Roberto Carlos and Jennifer Lopez

from the album Roberto Carlos and Amor Sin Límite
- Released: December 16, 2016
- Recorded: 2016
- Length: 3:57
- Label: Nuyorican; Sony Music Latin
- Songwriter: Kany García

Jennifer Lopez singles chronology
"Love Make the World Go Round" (2016)	"Chegaste" (2016)	"Ni Tú Ni Yo" (2017)

Roberto Carlos singles chronology
"Tu Regreso" (2016)	"Chegaste" (2016)	"Sereia" (2017)

Audio video
- "Chegaste" on YouTube

"Chegaste" is a song recorded by Brazilian singer Roberto Carlos and American singer Jennifer Lopez. The song was first written in Spanish and then recorded in Portuguese. The latter version was released on her YouTube on December 15, 2016 and was released for digital download and on Spotify the next day, later being included on Carlos' 2017 self-titled extended play. The original version of the song, "Llegaste", was released on Carlos' Spanish album Amor Sin Límite (2018).

== Background and release ==
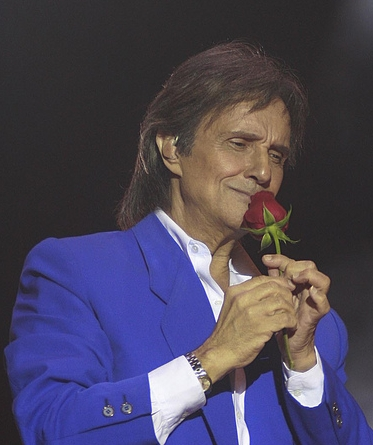
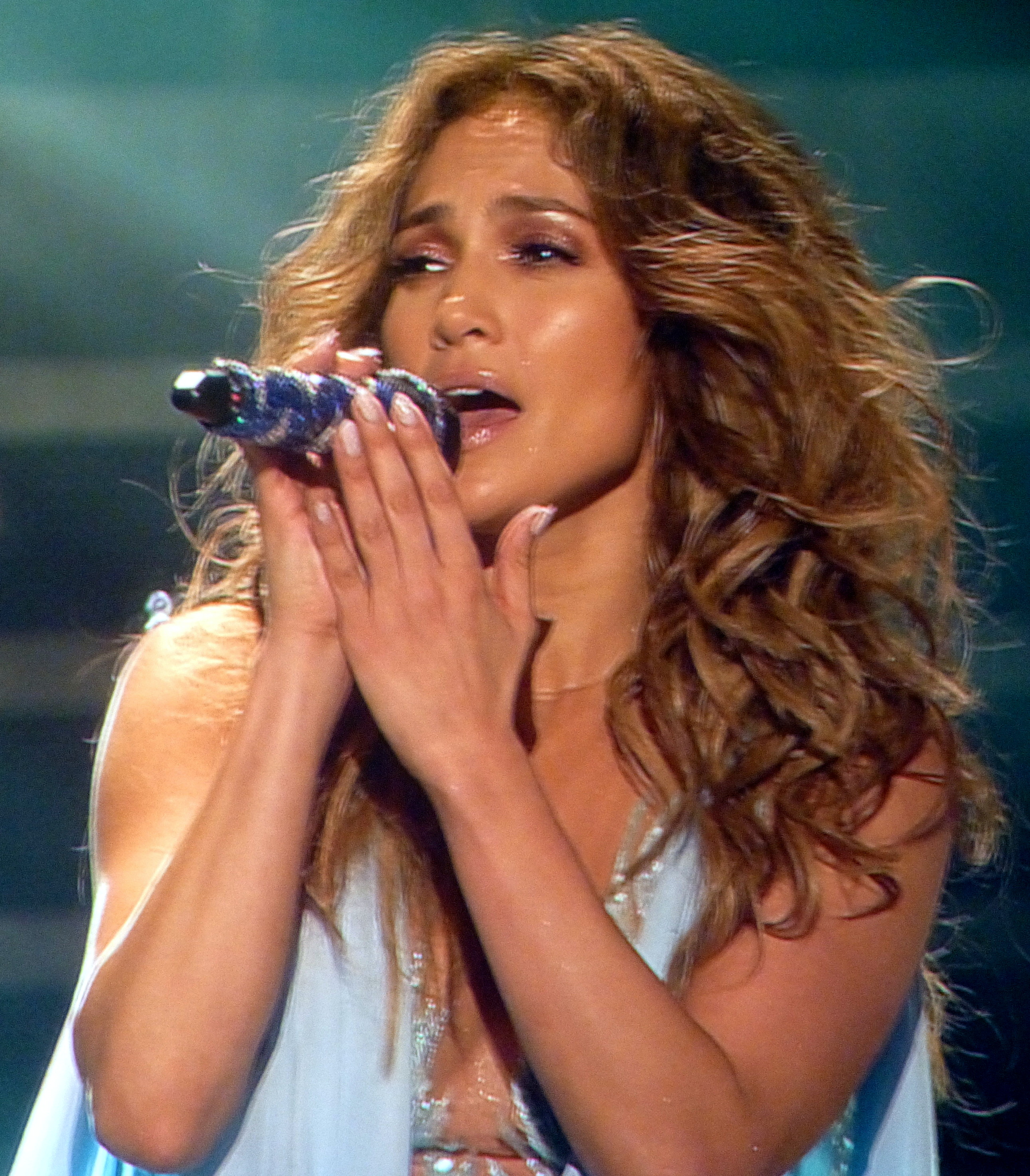
Roberto Carlos and Jennifer Lopez

In October 2016, Billboard magazine confirmed that Lopez is working on her second Spanish album, which is set to be released in 2017 through Sony Music Latin. Marc Anthony serves as executive producer for the album. The following month, she released a cover version of the single "Olvidame y Pega la Vuelta", a duet with Anthony, as the album's first single. Puerto Rican singer-songwriter Kany García posted a photo with Lopez and Carlos on October 17, revealing that the singers had collaborated. Carlos traveled to Los Angeles where he and Lopez recorded their parts separately before meeting. O Globo reported that the song was recorded in Spanish as well. "Chegaste" was released via digital platforms on December 16, 2016. Of working with Carlos, Lopez tweeted: "Honored & excited to have worked with such a living legend like Roberto Carlos."

== Composition ==
"Chegaste" is a ballad, which was composed by Kany García. It is Lopez's first song to feature her singing in Portuguese. Its instrumentation includes the chords of a piano and guitar. Carlos described the song lyrically as "a very romantic ballad".

== Music video ==
The official music video for "Chegaste" was shot in Los Angeles, and premiered on Carlos' special on Rede Globo on December 23, 2016.

== Charts ==
Chart (2016)	Peak position
Brazil (Billboard Hot 100)	37
Brazil (Billboard Brasil Pop Airplay)	3

== Release history ==
Country	Date	Format	Label	Ref.
United States	December 16, 2016	Digital download	Nuyorican; Sony Music Latin	
