= Nuyorican Productions =

American production company founded

Nuyorican Productions, Inc.
- Type: Private
- Industry: Film & TV
- Founded: 2001; 25 years ago
- Founder: Benny Medina; Jennifer Lopez
- Headquarters: 1100 Glendon Avenue, Los Angeles, California
- Key people: Jennifer Lopez (Principal); Elaine Goldsmith-Thomas (President); Natalie Haack Flores (Vice President of Development); Larry Del Santo (Head of Unscripted); Courtney Baxter (Physical Production Executive)

Nuyorican Productions, Inc. is an American production company founded by Benny Medina and Jennifer Lopez. The name “Nuyorican” reflects Lopez's Puerto Rican heritage and her upbringing in New York. In other words, the name is a portmanteau of "New York" and "Puerto Rican".

== History ==
Lopez owns the film and television production company Nuyorican Productions, which was launched as early as 2001. It was co-founded with her manager Benny Medina, who was supposed to receive half the producing revenue from the company. Lopez split with Medina shortly after the company was founded. In September 2003, Nuyorican Productions partnered with HBO to create a documentary about Los Quinces, a traditional ball held to celebrate a Cuban girl's 15th birthday. In 2004, her production company was signed with Fox and Regency Television.

Nuyorican Productions produced South Beach, a primetime television drama that aired from January 6 to February 11, 2006, on UPN. The series, which stars Vanessa L. Williams, follows three young adults "trying to get ahead in Miami". The show experienced low ratings and received generally negative reviews from critics. With UPN shutting down and moving its programming to The CW that fall, South Beach was one of many shows that weren't moved over to the new network. Screenwriter Jack Bunick filed a lawsuit in April stating that the plot for South Beach was copied from South Beach Miami, a script he wrote in 1999. Bunick alleged he pitched the idea to UPN, but was never contacted back. The lawsuit named Lopez, UPN, CBS Television and others as defendants. It was dropped in April 2008 by U.S. District Judge Richard Berman, who stated that there's inadequate evidence to take the case to trial.

El Cantante, a film in which Lopez starred alongside then-husband Marc Anthony, was Nuyorican Production's first production. Nuyorican Productions produced the Univisión miniseries Como Ama una Mujer, named after her album of that title. It ran five episodes from October 30 to November 27, 2007, and starred Adriana Cruz. Another show that came from her production company, Brethren which Fox gave script commitment, and it later aired on the channel. In November 2011, it was announced that Nuyorican Productions will produce Where in the World Is Carmen Sandiego?, a film adaption of the educational children's game. In 2012, it was announced Lopez is producing a drama series called The Fosters for the cable network Freeform. In 2008, the company signed a deal with Universal Media Studios. In January 2019, Alex Brown was hired as Production Executive, but left the company soon after. In August 2019, Catherine Hagedorn joined the company as Head of Development before leaving to become Lili Reinhart's producing partner in June 2021.

Most recently, the company signed a multi-year first look deal with Netflix. Natalie Haack Flores was hired as Vice President of Development, with Larry Del Santo being promoted to Head of Unscripted Development and Courtney Baxter to Physical Production Executive.

== Logo ==
The company's logo is a replica of the Empire State Building with a coconut tree near it, referencing the combination of New York and Puerto Rico.

== Filmography ==
=== Films ===
Year	Title	Ref.
2006	El Cantante	
2007	Bordertown	
2007	Feel the Noise	
2015	The Boy Next Door	
2018	Second Act	
2019	Hustlers	
2022	Marry Me	
2022	Jennifer Lopez: Halftime	
2023	Shotgun Wedding	
2023	The Mother	
2024	This Is Me... Now: A Love Story	
2024	The Greatest Love Story Never Told	
2024	Atlas	
2024	Unstoppable	
2025	Kiss of the Spider Woman	
2026	Office Romance	
TBA	Bob the Builder	
TBA	The Last Mrs. Parrish	

=== Television series ===
Year	Title	Notes	Ref.
2006	South Beach		
2007	DanceLife		
2007	Jennifer Lopez Presents: Como Ama una Mujer		
2011–14	South Beach Tow		
2012	Q'Viva! The Chosen		
2012	Big Easy Justice		
2013	A Step Away		
2013–18	The Fosters		
2014	Los Jets		
2016–18	Shades of Blue		
2017–21	World of Dance		
2019–24	Good Trouble		
2020–21	Thanks A Million		
TBA	C.R.I.S.P.R.	NBC procedural drama; in development	
TBA	Rosarito Beach	CBS comedy drama; in development	
TBA	Happy Place	Netflix drama; in development	
TBA	Backwards In Heels		
TBA	Cinderella		
TBA	She Gets It From Me		

=== Television specials ===
- Jennifer Lopez in Concert (2001)
- Jennifer Lopez: Dance Again (2014)
- Neighborhood Sessions: Jennifer Lopez (2015)

=== Online series ===
- Tiger Beat Entertainment (2012)

== Discography ==
=== Album ===
- "This Is Me...Now" (2024)

=== Singles ===
- "Booty" (2014)
- "Olvídame y Pega la Vuelta" (2016)
- "Chegaste" (2016)
- "Ni Tú Ni Yo" (2017)
- "Amor, Amor, Amor" (2017)
- "El Anillo" (2018)
- "Medicine" (2019)
- "In the Morning" (2020)
- "Cambia el Paso" (2021)
- "Can't Get Enough" (2024)
- "Rebound" (2024)
- "Birthday" (2025)
