= In the Morning (Jennifer Lopez song) =

2020 single by Jennifer Lopez

Single by Jennifer Lopez
- Released: November 27, 2020
- Genre: Pop
- Length: 2:47
- Label: Hitco; Nuyorican
- Songwriters: Daniel Rondon; Jackson Foote; James Abrahart; Jennifer Lopez; Jeremy Dussolliet; Johnny Simpson; Patrick Ingunza; Tim Sommers
- Producers: Jackson Foote; Johnny Simpson

Jennifer Lopez singles chronology
"Lonely" (2020)	"In the Morning" (2020)	"Cambia el Paso" (2021)

Music video
- "In the Morning" on YouTube

"In the Morning" is a song recorded by American singer-songwriter Jennifer Lopez. It was written by Daniel Rondon, Jackson Foote, James Abrahart, Lopez, Jeremy Dussolliet, Johnny Simpson, Patrick Ingunza, and Tim Sommers, while the production was handled by Foote and Simpson. The song was released on November 27, 2020, by Hitco Entertainment and Nuyorican Productions.

== Music video ==
The music video for "In the Morning" premiered exclusively on the app Triller. It includes scenes of Lopez "wearing nothing but huge angel wings". Lopez stated that the video is "full of symbolism about a dark one-sided relationship and the realization that you can’t change anyone else (...) Grow your own wings and walk away from anyone or anything that doesn’t truly value all you have to offer."

== Live performances ==
Lopez performed the song live for the first time during Dick Clark's New Year's Rockin' Eve with Ryan Seacrest, the annual New Year's Eve television special broadcast by ABC from Times Square, Manhattan, on December 31, 2020.

== Critical reception ==
GSG Media said that the song "is a gem which sees the singer take on a new direction. It all gets underway with a sublime vocal performance from Lopez." They also added that "As the track progresses, Lopez cements her hook deep."

== Track listing ==
- Digital download and streaming
1. "In the Morning" – 2:47

== Credits and personnel ==
Credits adapted from Tidal.

- Daniel Rondon – songwriter
- Jackson Foote – songwriter, producer
- James Abrahart – songwriter
- Jennifer Lopez – songwriter
- Jeremy Dussolliet – songwriter
- Johnny Simpson – songwriter, producer
- Patrick Ingunza – songwriter
- Tim Sommers – songwriter
- Colin Leonard – masterer

== Charts ==
=== Weekly charts ===
Weekly chart performance for "In the Morning"
Chart (2020–21)	Peak position
Canada Digital Songs (Billboard)	13
Hungary (Rádiós Top 40)	19
Hungary (Single Top 40)	16
UK Singles Downloads (Official Charts)	93

=== Year-end charts ===
Year-end chart performance for "In the Morning"
Chart (2021)	Position
Hungary (Rádiós Top 40)	63

== Release history ==
Release dates and formats for "In the Morning"
Region	Date	Format	Label	Ref.
Various	November 27, 2020	Digital download; streaming	Hitco; Nuyorican	
