= Cambia el Paso =

2021 single by Jennifer Lopez and Rauw Alejandro

Single by Jennifer Lopez and Rauw Alejandro
- English title: "Change the Pace"
- Released: July 5, 2021
- Recorded: April 22 – May 11, 2021
- Genre: Pop; reggaeton
- Length: 4:06
- Label: Nuyorican; Sony Latin
- Songwriters: Jennifer Lopez; Reggi el Auténtico; Georgia Ku; Andrés Castro; Jonas Jurström; Victor Thell; Mr. Naisgai; Caleb Calloway; Rauw Alejandro
- Producers: Jonas Jurström; Victor Thell

Jennifer Lopez singles chronology
"In the Morning" (2021)	"Cambia el Paso" (2021)	"On My Way" (2021)

Rauw Alejandro singles chronology
"Sexo Virtual" (2021)	"Cambia el Paso" (2021)	"Una Más" (2021)

Music video
- "Cambia el Paso" on YouTube

"Cambia el Paso" is a song by American singer Jennifer Lopez and Puerto Rican singer Rauw Alejandro. It was co-written by the duo alongside Reggi el Auténtico, Georgia Ku, Andrés Castro, Jonas Jurström, Victor Thell, Mr. Naisgai and Caleb Calloway. "Cambia el Paso" was released as a standalone single on July 5, 2021, by Nuyorican Productions and Sony Music Latin.

== Background and release ==
"Cambia el Paso" was recorded after Lopez's split from ex-fiancé Alex Rodriguez. Prior to the song's recording, Alejandro asked Lopez to collaborate with him on another song of his titled "Tu La Tienes", which she agreed to. The pair subsequently met for the first time, with Lopez recalling: "I said, 'Let me play you some things I’ve been working on.' He heard 'Cambia el Paso', and he was like, 'Well, I can do that one too. Why can’t I get on that one?'" Alejandro then recorded his parts for "Cambia el Paso" on the spot.

On June 25, 2021, Alejandro revealed in an interview that he recorded two songs with Lopez; one for his project and one for hers. Over the next few days, Lopez posted a series of 12-second snippets of "Cambia el Paso" on her Instagram account, leading up to the June 29 announcement that the single would be released on July 5. According to the singer, the song is about "change" and "not being afraid to take the step". The song discusses "a woman who leaves an undeserving man". The song's lyrics, when translated into English, contain statements such as "He doesn't deserve to have her in his arms" and "Your life is better now without him."

== Music video ==
The music video for "Cambia el Paso" was directed by Jessy Terrero and shot in Miami Beach from June 8 – 9, 2021. Shortly after they finished filming, Lopez posted a photo from the shoot on Instagram with the caption: "There's only one... Good things coming...", with the hashtag #CambiaElPaso. She briefly teased the music video on her Instagram on July 2, before posting a 15-second sneak peek two days later. The music video premiered on July 9. The music video "opens on Lopez breaking free from a contentious situation, before she discovers joy dancing in the streets and on a beach."

== Live performances ==
Lopez performed the song live for the first time during the Global Citizen Live concert in New York City on September 26, 2021.

== Critical reception ==
Cambia el Paso received positive response. Emily Zemler of Rolling Stone calls the song "a fiery song; with a slick beat and Reggaeton grooves." Quinci Legardye of Harpers Bazaar said the song "has empowering lyrics about moving on and not being afraid of change." Zoe Haylock of Vulture called the song "a beat-thumping Spanish-language track."

== Credits and personnel ==
- Andrés Castro – songwriter
- Georgia Ku – songwriter
- Héctor Caleb López p/k/a Caleb Calloway – songwriter
- Jennifer Lopez – songwriter, vocals
- Jonas Jurström – songwriter, producer
- Luis Jonuel González p/k/a Mr. Naisgai – songwriter
- Rafael Regginalds Aponte a/k/a Reggi el Auténtico – songwriter
- Raúl Alejandro Ocasio Ruiz "Rauw Alejandro" – songwriter, vocals
- Victor Thell – songwriter, producer
- Micheline Medina – coordinator
- Chris Athens – master engineer
- Trevor Muzzy – mixing engineer, recording engineer
- Brandon Riester - A&R

== Charts ==
Weekly chart performance for "Cambia el Paso"
Chart (2021)	Peak position
Canada Digital Song Sales (Billboard)	42
Czech Republic Airplay (ČNS IFPI)	59
Dominican Republic Pop (Monitor Latino)	10
El Salvador Pop (Monitor Latino)	16
Guatemala (Monitor Latino)	8
Hungary (Single Top 40)	17
Panama (PRODUCE)	7
Paraguay Pop (Monitor Latino)	16
Puerto Rico (Monitor Latino)	6
Romania (Airplay 100)	85
Spain (PROMUSICAE)	98
US Hot Latin Songs (Billboard)	21
US Latin Airplay (Billboard)	39
Venezuela Airplay (Monitor Latino)	18
