= Amor, Amor, Amor =

Single by Jennifer Lopez featuring Wisin
- Language: Spanish
- English title: "Love, Love, Love"
- Released: November 10, 2017
- Studio: Criteria Studios (Miami, FL)
- Genre: Reggaeton
- Length: 3:18
- Label: Nuyorican; Sony Latin
- Songwriters: Germán Hernández; Jennifer Lopez; Juan Luis Morera; Marco Antonio Muñiz; Oscar "Oscarcito" Hernández
- Producers: Arbise "Motiff" González; Julio Reyes Copello; Los Legendarios; Marc Anthony; Hernández; Wisin

Jennifer Lopez singles chronology
| "Ni Tú Ni Yo" (2017) | "Amor, Amor, Amor" (2017) | "Us" (2018) |

Wisin singles chronology
| "Como Antes" (2017) | "Amor, Amor, Amor" (2017) | "Fiebre" (2018) |

Music video
- "Amor, Amor, Amor" on YouTube

"Amor, Amor, Amor" is a single recorded by American singer and entertainer Jennifer Lopez, featuring Puerto Rican rapper Wisin, intended for her cancelled second Spanish-language album Por Primera Vez. It was written by Germán Hernández, Lopez, Wisin, Marc Anthony and Oscar "Oscarcito" Hernández, while production was handled by Arbise "Motiff" González, Julio Reyes Copello, Los Legendarios, Anthony, Hernández and Wisin. It was released digitally on November 10, 2017, by Nuyorican Productions and Sony Music Latin.

== Background ==
"Amor, Amor, Amor" is the second single from Lopez's cancelled second full-length Spanish album Por Primera Vez, following "Ni Tú Ni Yo" in July 2017. She described the album as being about "how we are always kind of reinventing ourselves, experiencing things for the first time, no matter how old you are", and of singing in Spanish stated: "There’s just something about it that is more romantic and passionate to me, and that’s such a core part of who I am." "Amor, Amor, Amor" marks the third collaboration between Lopez and Wisin, following "Follow the Leader" (2012) and "Adrenalina" (2014). Discussing working with Lopez, Wisin stated: "It’s always an honor to work with talented people who are visionary and want to keep growing. I respect her very much in many aspects. At the beginning of my career she was one of the big artists that gave me an opportunity and believed in what we did."

== Composition ==
"Amor, Amor, Amor" is a reggaeton song that fuses dance and urban music styles. It was written by Lopez, Juan Luis Morera, Oscar "Oscarcito" Hernández, German Hernandez, and Marco Antonio Muñiz. In the chorus, Lopez sings "Cuando hacemos el amor/Amor, amor, amor/Vuelvo a la vida cuando toco tu cuerpo", which translates to "when we make love, I come back to life when I touch your body." Of his collaboration with Lopez, Wisin said: "I think it’s a great blessing that Jennifer dares to do songs like this (...) I tried to take her towards a more urban, rhythmic and electronic sound, and I think we achieved that."

== Critical response ==
Time writer Raisa Bruner praised the song as a "celebratory Latin jam", stating that "it’s a worthy contender to follow smash Latin hits 'Despacito' and 'Mi Gente' if those have lost their “wow” factor for repeat listeners."

== Chart performance ==
In the United States, "Amor, Amor, Amor" peaked at number ten on the Hot Latin Songs chart for the week ending December 2, 2017. This was higher than her previous single, "Ni Tú Ni Yo", which reached number fifteen. For the week ending February 3, 2018, the song topped the Billboard Latin Airplay chart, increasing by 59% to 15.3 million in Latin airplay audience. It became her sixth song to reach number one on this chart.

== Music video ==
The music video for "Amor, Amor, Amor" was directed by Jessy Terrero and shot at Manhattan's Bowery subway station in September 2017. Terrero previously worked with Lopez on the music videos for "Live It Up", "Follow the Leader", "Adrenalina" and "I Luh Ya Papi". The clip was released on November 10, 2017; it depicts Lopez turning "a grimy subway platform into a steamy dance club" according to Rolling Stone. It features a number of dancers from her series World of Dance, including Eva Igo, Diana Pombo, The Lab, Ian Eastwood and Power Peralta twins. In the clip, Lopez and Wisin meet with their respective troupes for a dance-off in a vacant subway station, before they all board the train. The dancers recreate a competition while Lopez and Wisin sing to each other before exiting in Wisin's Abarth. The video generated 8 million views in its first three days.

== Charts ==
| Chart (2017–18) | Peak position |
|---|---|
| Bolivia (Monitor Latino) | 11 |
| Chile Pop Songs (Monitor Latino) | 10 |
| Dominican Republic Pop Songs (Monitor Latino) | 8 |
| Ecuador (National-Report) | 39 |
| Finland Digital Songs (Billboard) | 10 |
| France (SNEP) | 120 |
| Hungary (Single Top 40) | 21 |
| Italy (FIMI) | 99 |
| Mexico Espanol Airplay (Billboard) | 25 |
| Panama Pop Songs (Monitor Latino) | 9 |
| Poland Airplay (ZPAV) | 33 |
| Poland Dance (ZPAV) | 9 |
| Spain (PROMUSICAE) | 60 |
| Switzerland (Schweizer Hitparade) | 33 |
| US Bubbling Under Hot 100 (Billboard) | 19 |
| US Latin Airplay (Billboard) | 1 |
| US Hot Latin Songs (Billboard) | 10 |
| Venezuela (National-Report) | 48 |

== Certifications ==
| Region | Certification | Certified units/sales |
|---|---|---|
| Mexico (AMPROFON) | Gold | 30,000^{‡} |
^{‡} Sales+streaming figures based on certification alone.

== See also ==
- List of Billboard number-one Latin songs of 2018
