= Us (Jennifer Lopez song) =

Single by Jennifer Lopez
- Released: February 2, 2018
- Recorded: March 2017
- Genre: Pop; dance
- Length: 3:13
- Label: Epic
- Songwriters: Jason "Poo Bear" Boyd; Sonny John "Skrillex" Moore
- Producers: Poo Bear; Skrillex

Jennifer Lopez singles chronology
"Amor, Amor, Amor" (2017)	"Us" (2018)	"Se Acabó el Amor" (2018)

Audio video
- "Us" on YouTube

"Us" is a song by American singer Jennifer Lopez. It was written and produced by Poo Bear and Skrillex. The song was released digitally on February 2, 2018, by Epic Records. The song premiered at Calibash 2018, sung part in Spanish and part in English however the version released as a single is sung in English. Lopez performed the song live at DirecTV's pre-Super Bowl Super Saturday Night concert, and despite teasing a remix with Scottish DJ Calvin Harris, no remixes or further promotion took place. "Us" debuted at number five on the Finland Digital Songs chart and top-thirty on the Hot Canadian Digital Songs.

== Background and composition ==
In March 2017, Lopez revealed through an Instagram post that she was in the studio with Skrillex and Poo Bear. In the video, she could be heard singing along to the hook "could it be us?" "Us" is Lopez's first English single since "Ain't Your Mama" (2016). The dance-pop song was written and produced by Skrillex and Poo Bear. Describing its composition, David Klemow of the website Dancing Astronaut observed its use of "playful vocal chops in the melody and comfortable percussion rhythms." Described as a "hopeful love song", it features lyrics about longing for more. Lopez revealed that the song is inspired by her relationship with then-boyfriend Alex Rodriguez. "Us" is characterized by a "pulsing beat", with its chorus being followed by a "synth-and-drum-driven breakdown". It is performed in the key of G minor with a tempo of 124 beats per minute. The song was previewed during Lopez's set at Calibash 2018, where the first verse was sung in Spanish. She also teased a remix by Calvin Harris. At the time of writing, the version of "Us" released for streaming and download is sung entirely in English and no further versions or remixes spawned.

== Reception ==
Billboard writer Kat Bein observed: "It sounds a lot like Skrillex and Poo Bear's previous work, using similar vocal pitch techniques to create counter melodies and a cartoonishly-joyous hook (...) This tune has the island warmth you need to get through the rest of winter." Hugh McIntyre of Fuse described its production as "simultaneously odd and alluring", writing: "Unlike many of her other recent pop efforts, Lopez's vocals soar higher than the music, which is kept decidedly mid-tempo. Whether or not it ends up being one of her biggest hits, 'Us' perfectly defines the superstar's career, while still feeling incredibly fresh and forward-thinking. It's pop, it's dance, it's Latin-influenced...it's J.Lo!"

== Live performances ==
Lopez first performed the song during her set at Calibash 2018, which took place at the Staples Center. At the time, its title was not revealed. On February 3, 2018, Lopez headlined DirecTV's pre-Super Bowl Super Saturday Night concert, where she gave her first televised performance of "Us".

== Personnel ==
Credits adapted from Tidal.

- Jennifer Lopez – vocals
- Sonny John Moor (Skrillex) – lyricist, producer
- Jason "Poo Bear" Boyd – lyricist, producer
- Josh Gudwin – mixing engineer
- Emerson Mancini – mastering engineer
- Trevor Muzzy – recording engineer

== Charts ==
Chart (2018)	Peak position
Canada (Hot Canadian Digital Songs)	28
Finland Digital Song Sales (Billboard)	5

== Release history ==
Release dates and formats for "Us"
Region	Date	Format	Label	Ref.
United States	February 2, 2018	Digital download; streaming	Epic	
