= Save Me Tonight =

Single by Jennifer Lopez and David Guetta
- Released: March 6, 2026
- Recorded: 2025
- Genre: Dance pop
- Length: 3:16
- Label: What a Producer; Warner
- Songwriters: Amanda Ibanez; David Guetta; Giorgio Tuinfort; James Essien; Ryan Tedder; Timofey Reznikov; Tyler Spry
- Producers: David Guetta; Giorgio Tuinfort; Timofey Reznikov; Tyler Spry

Jennifer Lopez singles chronology
"Birthday" (2025)	"Save Me Tonight" (2026)	"Everything's Fine" (2026)

David Guetta singles chronology
"Walked Away" (2026)	"Save Me Tonight" (2026)	"Ranjha" (2026)

Music video
- "Save Me Tonight" on YouTube

"Save Me Tonight" is a song recorded by the American actress and singer Jennifer Lopez and the French DJ and record producer David Guetta. It was released on March 6, 2026, by Guetta's label What a Producer and Warner Records.

== Background and release ==
The song marks the first collaboration between Jennifer Lopez and David Guetta, and represents Lopez's return to dance-pop sounds several years after her most recent releases in the genre.

In the months following its release, four official remixes of the song were released by various DJs (Joel Corry, Arno Cost and Norman Doray, Seth Hills, and DJs from Mars), as well as a Spanish language version titled "Sálvame Hoy" featuring Mexican singer Gabito Ballesteros.

== Writing and recording ==
"Save Me Tonight" was written by Guetta, Ryan Tedder, Giorgio Tuinfort, James Essien, Timofey Reznikov, Tyler Spry, and Amanda "Kiddo A.I." Ibanez. In 2025 Guetta, Tedder and Lopez gathered at the French DJ studio to create the track.

== Commercial performance ==
On May 2, 2026, "Save Me Tonight" reached number one on Billboard's Dance/Mix Show Airplay chart, marking Lopez's second chart-topper after "On the Floor" featuring Pitbull in 2011, and Guetta's 21st, extending his record as the artist with the most number ones on the chart. As a result, Lopez achieved her tenth number-one in 2026 across different Billboard radio charts.

== Live performances ==
The year before its official release as a single, the song was first performed by Lopez during her concert at the World Pride Music Festival in Washington, D.C., on June 6, 2025, before becoming part of the set list for every date of her summer tour Up All Night: Live in 2025.

On April 11, 2026, Lopez and Guetta performed the song together for the first time as a surprise appearance during Guetta's DJ set at Coachella.

== Music video ==
The music video, directed by Cole Dabney and consisting of footage from Lopez's performances during the Up All Night: Live in 2025 tour, was released simultaneously with the song through the artists' YouTube channels.

== Track listing ==
Digital download and streaming

1. "Save Me Tonight" – 3:16
2. "Save Me Tonight" (extended) – 4:12

Digital download and streaming – Joel Corry remix

1. "Save Me Tonight" (Joel Corry remix) – 2:41
2. "Save Me Tonight" (Joel Corry remix extended) – 4:04
3. "Save Me Tonight" – 3:16

Digital download and streaming – Arno Cost & Norman Doray remix

1. "Save Me Tonight" (Arno Cost & Norman Doray remix) – 3:14
2. "Save Me Tonight" (Arno Cost & Norman Doray remix extended) – 5:29
3. "Save Me Tonight" – 3:16

Digital download and streaming – Seth Hills remix

1. "Save Me Tonight" (Seth Hills remix) – 3:22
2. "Save Me Tonight" (Seth Hills extended remix) – 4:35
3. "Save Me Tonight" – 3:16

Digital download and streaming – DJs from Mars remix

1. "Save Me Tonight" (DJs from Mars remix) – 3:05
2. "Save Me Tonight" (DJs from Mars remix extended) – 3:48

Digital download and streaming – Spanish version

1. "Sálvame Hoy" (featuring Gabito Ballesteros) – 3:35

== Charts ==
=== Weekly charts ===
Weekly chart performance
Chart (2026)	Peak position
Argentina Anglo Airplay (Monitor Latino)	8
Austria Airplay (MusicTrace)	1
Belarus Airplay (TopHit)	89
Belgium (Ultratop 50 Flanders)	13
Belgium (Ultratop 50 Wallonia)	31
Central America Anglo Airplay (Monitor Latino)	11
Chile Anglo Airplay (Monitor Latino)	7
CIS Airplay (TopHit)	49
Croatia International Airplay (Top lista)	6
Ecuador Anglo Airplay (Monitor Latino)	11
Estonia Airplay (TopHit)	11
Finland Airplay (Radiosoittolista)	21
France (SNEP)	48
France Airplay (SNEP)	8
Germany Airplay (BVMI)	10
Global Dance Radio (Billboard/WARM)	4
Honduras Anglo Airplay (Monitor Latino)	1
Hungary (Rádiós Top 40)	12
Italy Airplay (EarOne)	67
Kazakhstan Airplay (TopHit)	9
Latin America Anglo Airplay (Monitor Latino)	16
Latvia Airplay (TopHit)	23
Lithuania Airplay (TopHit)	21
Malta Airplay (Radiomonitor)	9
Moldova Airplay (TopHit)	71
Netherlands Airplay (Radiomonitor)	23
New Zealand Hot Singles (RMNZ)	16
Nicaragua Anglo Airplay (Monitor Latino)	2
North Macedonia Airplay (Radiomonitor)	4
Norway Airplay (IFPI Norge)	67
Panama Anglo Airplay (Monitor Latino)	4
Paraguay Anglo Airplay (Monitor Latino)	9
Romania Airplay (UPFR)	9
Romania Airplay (Media Forest)	19
Romania TV Airplay (Media Forest)	13
Russia Airplay (TopHit)	64
Serbia Airplay (Radiomonitor)	8
Slovakia Airplay (ČNS IFPI)	4
Slovenia Airplay (Radiomonitor)	2
Switzerland Airplay (IFPI)	14
Ukraine Airplay (TopHit)	132
UK Singles Downloads (Official Charts)	18
UK Singles Sales (OCC)	20
Uruguay Anglo Airplay (Monitor Latino)	6
US Dance Airplay (Billboard)	1
US Hot Dance/Electronic Songs (Billboard)	18

=== Monthly charts ===
Monthly chart performance
Chart (2026)	Peak position
CIS Airplay (TopHit)	54
Estonia Airplay (TopHit)	12
Kazakhstan Airplay (TopHit)	16
Latvia Airplay (TopHit)	67
Lithuania Airplay (TopHit)	23
Romania Airplay (TopHit)	36
Russia Airplay (TopHit)	81

== Certifications ==
Certifications
Region	Certification	Certified units/sales
France (SNEP)	Gold	100,000^{‡}
^{‡} Sales+streaming figures based on certification alone.

== Release history ==
"Save Me Tonight" release dates and formats
Region	Date	Format	Version(s)	Label	Ref.
Various	March 6, 2026	Digital download; streaming	Original version	What a Producer; Warner	
Italy	March 6, 2026	Contemporary hit radio	Original version	Warner	
Various	March 27, 2026	Digital download; streaming	Joel Corry remix	What a Producer; Warner	
Various	April 3, 2026	Digital download; streaming	Arno Cost & Norman Doray remix	What a Producer; Warner	
Various	April 24, 2026	Digital download; streaming	Seth Hills remix	What a Producer; Warner	
Various	May 22, 2026	Digital download; streaming	DJs from Mars remix	What a Producer; Warner	
Various	May 29, 2026	Digital download; streaming	Spanish version featuring Gabito Ballesteros	What a Producer; Warner	
Italy	May 29, 2026	Contemporary hit radio	Spanish version featuring Gabito Ballesteros	Warner	

== See also ==
- List of Billboard number-one dance songs of 2026
