= Up All Night: Live in 2025 =

2025 concert tour by Jennifer Lopez

- Tour by Jennifer Lopez
- Promotional poster
- Location: Asia; Europe
- Start date: July 8, 2025
- End date: August 12, 2025
- No. of shows: 20

Jennifer Lopez concert chronology
- It's My Party (2019); Up All Night: Live in 2025 (2025); Jennifer Lopez: Up All Night Live in Las Vegas (2025–2026)

Up All Night: Live in 2025 was the fifth concert tour by the American entertainer Jennifer Lopez. It was Lopez's first tour in six years, following It's My Party (2019). The tour commenced on July 8, 2025, in Pontevedra, Spain, and concluded on August 12 of the same year in Sardinia, Italy, consisting of twenty shows.

== Background and development ==
In February 2024, Lopez announced This Is Me... Live in support of her ninth studio album, This Is Me... Now (2024). Two months later, the tour was re-branded as a greatest hits tour, with media outlets, such as Variety citing weak ticket sales. In May 2024, Lopez cancelled the tour, citing her decision to spend more time with close family and friends, revealing the decision was "necessary".

On April 7, 2025, she announced the tour, along with five concerts in Spain. The following day, Italian publication Rockol reported a full itinerary of 17 concerts across Africa, Asia and Europe. On April 14, 2025, it was announced the July 27 concert in would be part of the Summer in the City Festival. In addition, a concert for August 5, in Istanbul, Turkey, was listed on Bubilet. A concert in Almaty, Kazakhstan, and Tashkent, Uzbekistan, were announced on May 21 and 27, 2025, respectively. That June, it was announced that the July 11 concert in Málaga had been canceled due to "logistical challenges"; a concert in Fuengirola was announced for the same date. On July 3, 2025, a show was announced for the Cala di Volpe Gala Night in Sardinia, Italy, on August 12.

== Set list ==
This set list is from the July 8, 2025, concert in Pontevedra. It does not represent all concerts for the tour.

1. "On the Floor"
2. "Save Me Tonight"
3. "Booty"
4. "Ain't Your Mama" (with elements of Prince and the New Power Generation's "Sexy MF")
5. "Jenny from the Block" (rock version; "We Will Rock You" intro)
6. "I'm Real (Murder remix)"
7. "Regular"
8. "Get Right"
9. "Moments in Love"
10. "I'm Into You"
11. "Birthday"
12. "Love Don't Cost a Thing"
13. "All I Have"
14. "Gracias a la vida"
15. "If You Had My Love"
16. "Ain't It Funny"
17. "Qué Hiciste"
18. "Si Una Vez"
19. "Wreckage of You"
20. "Waiting for Tonight"
21. "Dance Again"
22. "Let's Get Loud" (Note: There are conflicting reports concerning the state of "Let's Get Loud" in the set list. Per Los 40, the song is included as an interlude; however, subsequent reports claim it as a standalone performance.)
23. "Play"
24. "Free"
25. "Up All Night"

=== Alterations ===
- Beginning with the July 10, 2025, concert in Cádiz, "El Anillo" was added to the set list, succeeding "Up All Night".

== Tour dates ==
List of 2025 concerts
Date (2025)	City	Country	Venue	Attendance	Revenue
July 8	Pontevedra (Note: Promoted as Vigo on official website.)	Spain	Parque Tafisa	–	—
July 10	Cádiz	Spain	Nuevo Mirandilla	–	—
July 11	Fuengirola	Spain	Marenostrum Fuengirola	–	—
July 13	Madrid	Spain	Movistar Arena	14,597 / 15,513	$3,997,046
July 15	Barcelona	Spain	Palau Sant Jordi	—	–
July 16	Bilbao	Spain	BEC	–	—
July 18 (Note: This concert is part of Tenerife Cook Music Fest.)	Tenerife	Spain	Puerto de Santa Cruz de Tenerife	—N/a	—N/a
July 20	Budapest	Hungary	MVM Dome	15,269 / 20,000	$3,416,543
July 21 (Note: This concert is part of Lucca Summer Festival.)	Lucca	Italy	Mura Storiche	—N/a	—N/a
July 23 (Note: The July 23, 2025, concert was originally scheduled for July 1, 2025, but was rescheduled to August 5 for undisclosed reasons. It was rescheduled again to July 23, for undisclosed reasons.)	Antalya	Turkey	Regnum Carya Resort Hotel	—	–
July 25	Warsaw	Poland	PGE Narodowy	–	—
July 27 (Note: This concert is part of the Summer in the City Festival.)	Bucharest	Romania	Piața Constituției	—N/a	—N/a
July 29	Abu Dhabi	United Arab Emirates	Etihad Arena	—	–
July 30 (Note: This concert was originally scheduled for July 4, 2025, but was rescheduled for undisclosed reasons.)	Sharm El Sheikh	Egypt	Rixos Radamis	–	—
August 1	Astana	Kazakhstan	Astana Arena	–	—
August 3	Yerevan	Armenia	Vazgen Sargsyan Republican Stadium	–	—
August 5 (Note: This concert is part of Istanbul Festival.)	Istanbul	Turkey	Yenikapi Festival Park	—N/a	—N/a
August 7	Tashkent	Uzbekistan	Milliy Stadium	—	—
August 10	Almaty	Kazakhstan	Central Stadium	–	—
August 12 (Note: This concert is part of the Cala di Volpe Gala Night.)	Sardinia	Italy	Hotel Cala di Volpe	—N/a	—N/a
Total				29,866 / 35,513 (84%)	$7,413,589

=== Canceled concerts ===
List of canceled concerts
Date (2025)	City	Country	Venue	Reason	Ref.
July 11	Málaga	Spain	Estadio Ciudad de Málaga	Logistical challenges	
