= Lady Bee =

Dutch electronic musician

Bianca Latupapua
- Born: Bianca Latupapua; October 6, 1983 (age 42)
- Occupation: electronic musician
- Years active: 2000–present
- Relatives: Marc Benjamin (brother)

Bianca Latupapua (born October 6, 1983), professionally known as Lady Bee, is a Dutch electronic musician, MC, DJ and producer. She first got involved in music as an MC at the age of 17, before becoming a DJ and producer. She has worked with a number of major Dutch musicians, including Hardwell, Laidback Luke and Sidney Samson. Many of which she featured on the vocals for.

Lady Bee also has her own solo career, most notably with the track, "Return of the Mack". The track reached number one on the Netherlands dance chart.

== Career ==
Lady Bee's career started when she collaborated with two Dutch EDM artists. At the time they were considered two of the biggest Dutch music acts, Hardwell and Sidney Samson. In 2006, she featured on the Sidney Samson track Girls, which was released by Spinnin' Records. After the success of her first featured track, Lady Bee followed up featuring on two tracks with Hardwell. The first track was titled Go Down, which was shortly followed by Play That Funk, both were released on Digidance. In 2006 came her first solo released aptly titled Plan Bee, released on Crème Fresh Music.

She collaborated with a number of artists in 2007, with two of those again with Sidney Samson. The tracks I Love It and You Don’t Love Me were released on Samson’s own Samsobeats. She also partnered with Hardwell on his Goes Like This track.

In 2009, she again collaborated with Sidney Samson on two more occasions with Let’s Go on Samsobeats and Shut Up And Let It Go on UK label, CR2 Records.

Lady Bee collaborated with Seductive in 2010 for Heat It Up, which was released on Steve Aoki’s Dim Mak Records. In 2011, she collaborated with Laidback Luke as a featuring artist on this Mixmash Records released, Mortal Comeback. A year later she partnered with Ravage on the Guillotine Recordings release Get World, shortly followed by Dani L Mebis on the Cloud 9 release Dancing Machine. Her first performance on Diplo’s Mad Decent Records, Sweet Like Chocolate was swiftly followed by Murda Dem, both tracks also released on Jeffrees. She returned to Aoki’s Dim Mak Records with This Is What We Came For and Laidback Luke’s Mixmash Records for her first official remix, Uberjak’d All I Need.

In 2014, Lady Bee teamed with a number of well-known artists. She partnered with BDMNR for a total of four tracks, Too Girlie, Gunshot, Don’t Pull A Fast One and the chart-topping Drop It Down Like. She then featured on Diplo's label, when she teamed up with Nina Sky for Do It All Again. Lady Bee also was produced the official remix for Deorro and Zoofunction’s Hype and Francesco Yates’ Call on US-label Big Beat Records. She ended the year collaborating with Dirty House artist Vato Gonzalez with We Be Like and The World Is Mine.

Lady Bee began 2015 with the Spinnin' Records track, Return of the Mack. It featured Rochelle Perts and was a number one single on a Netherlands single chart. This was followed up with Bring The Trumpets and That Paper featuring Feliciana. The track New Vibes featuring D-Rashid followed soon after and Sum Like That on Rebel Yard. Two further releases came via Mad Decent, Lady Bee again teamed up with Feliciana for the track Run Off and Lady Bee x CMC$ with Flowerz. She ended the year with the Dim Mak release Bucka, featuring Mr Vegas and Noise-Cans.

In 2016, she released three singles on Mixmash Records, Homeless Heart, Box Dem, and Droppin All These Dollaz. She also featured on Sony Music for the first time, featuring on their official release schedule with her In Mijn Systeem collaboration with Alvaro. She later released Wheels In Motion and another collaboration single, Higher. Her profile led Lady Bee to complete a number of remixes for various artists, including The Motto's Gunfighter, Nina Sky's Champion Lover and Girls Love DJs, In My Head. She also remixed NERVO's, Did We Forget, released on Ultra Records.

Most recently, Lady Bee has put out four singles, Skeem Op Een Millie; the Spinnin' Records release and Jalise feature, Rebel; Savages, a collaboration Wide Awake. The track premiered on Anna Lunoe’s Hyperhouse. The final track of 2017 was Overdose, featuring vocals from rising star Octavian on TrapNation.

== Lady Bee Invites ==
Lady Bee is responsible for an annual event at Amsterdam Dance Event. Lady Bee Invites showcases not only her own music but the music of other artists within the same wide genre as Lady Bee.
