= Orenburg twerking scandal =

2015 dance scandal in Russia

The Orenburg twerking scandal was a widely reported incident in Russia in April–May 2015 involving a viral video of teenage dancers performing twerking in a “Bees and Winnie-the-Pooh” routine that drew national outrage, international attention and an official investigation.

== Background ==
In January 2015, a group of girls at the Orenburg Youth Palace in Orenburg, Russia, performed a stage number called “Bees and Winnie‑the‑Pooh” in which they danced provocatively, including twerking moves, while wearing orange and black striped costumes. The routine was filmed and later uploaded to YouTube, where it went viral.

The video recording of the performance was noticed by the media on 13 April 2015, when it already had almost 4 million views and caused a great stir among users of the Russian-speaking internet, some of whom considered that the body movements in such a dance were too explicit for the age of the performers (9 of the 22 dancers were minors).

== Video content ==
External videos
- "Video footage of the dance routine ("Bees and Winnie the Pooh. Orenburg. School children's theatre")". 2015-04-12.

The performance began to the melody of the Soviet cartoon Winnie-the-Pooh. A participant dressed as a bear lifted a pot labeled “Honey” from the middle of the stage and showed the audience that it was empty. Moving to the back of the stage, the bear looked around. The music then changed to Lady Bee – Punani, and girls in black-and-orange striped costumes emerged from backstage, surrounding the bear. The dancers arranged themselves in three rows and began the twerking routine. Initially wearing black pleated miniskirts, the girls removed them simultaneously during the performance, continuing in striped swimsuits. At the end, the original cartoon melody played again.

== Public reaction ==
Once online, the video gained millions of views and sparked public debate in Russia over youth decency and cultural norms. Children's rights commissioner Pavel Astakhov denounced the performance as “vulgar and insulting”.

The Investigative Committee of Russia and local authorities launched a review to assess whether the performance constituted indecency or criminal negligence by the dance school. Municipal officials temporarily shut down the Kredo school pending investigation.

== Investigation ==
By May 2015, investigators concluded there was no legal basis to pursue criminal charges against the participants or organizers. The routine was deemed not to meet the legal threshold for indecency, and no charges were filed.

== Legacy ==
The Orenburg scandal highlighted tensions in Russian society over modern dance forms, the influence of Western pop culture, and how minors are presented in performance art. It prompted discussions about regulation of youth arts programs and broader cultural standards for public performance.

== Links ==
- Sergey Savin. "Wrong Bees. TV program "Segodnya" (April 15, 2015).
- Dance of the Bees (Russian). TV program "Right to Vote" (April 22, 2015).
- Dirty Dancing: What Shook the Orenburg "Bees" (Russian). TV program "Live" (April 22, 2015).
