= Mixmash Records =

- Founded: 2004
- Founder: Laidback Luke
- Status: Active
- Genre: House
- Country of origin: Netherlands
- Location: Amsterdam
- Official website: www.mixmashrecords.com

Mixmash Records is a record label founded by DJ and producer Laidback Luke. The label primarily distributes house music, with subgenres including electro house, future house and progressive house. Mixmash Records is known to provide young talents a platform and is considered by many to be one of the most important labels in terms of new sounds and genre developments. Some artists that have worked and published on Mixmash Records include Avicii, Afrojack, Steve Angello, Blasterjaxx, D.O.D, Inpetto, Keanu Silva, Mark Villa, A-Trak and Steve Aoki.

== History ==
Founded in 2004, the label was originally meant to be an outlet for Laidback Luke's productions. Later, it became an imprint where some upcoming talents released their first tracks. The label also has two sub-labels; Mixmash Deep—founded in 2015–and Ones To Watch Records—founded in 2013. Whilst Mixmash Deep focuses on deep house and future house tracks, Ones To Watch is more trap, Jersey House and Dirty Dutch oriented.

=== 2025 acquisition ===
In September 2025, Armada Music's investment arm, BEAT Music Fund, acquired the entire master rights catalog of Mixmash Records. The deal included major hits such as "Show Me Love" (with Steve Angello featuring Robin S) and "Turbulence" (with Steve Aoki featuring Lil Jon). Managing Director Olga Heijns stated that the partnership would ensure the long-term monetization and respect of the label's catalog.

== Catalog ==
=== Mixmash Records ===
Release date	Artist	Title	Catalogue No.
2004	Laidback Luke	Mixmash EP Vol. 1	MIXMA001
2004	Laidback Luke	F*ck the Revolution/Pass the Fury	MIXMA002
2004	Laidback Luke	Jahmirrahman Part II	MIXMA003
October 29, 2007	Laidback Luke Ft. MC Goodgrip	Rocking With The Best 2007	MIXMA004
March 5, 2008	Laidback Luke	Break Down the House	MIXMA005
November 5, 2007	Steve Angello & Laidback Luke	Be	MIXMA006
			MIXMA007
September 15, 2008	Laidback Luke & Roman Salzger Ft. Boogshe	Generation Noise	MIXMA008
December 3, 2008	Laidback Luke & A-Trak	Shake It Down	MIXMA009
March 24, 2009	Steve Angello & Laidback Luke Ft. Robin S	Show Me Love	MIXMA010
May 4, 2009	Laidback Luke	Need Your Loving	MIXMA011
June 3, 2009	Avicii	Ryu/Strutnut	MIXMA012
August 14, 2009	Weird Science	Haus of Cards	MIXMA013
September 11, 2009	Laidback Luke	My G*O*D (Guns On Demo)	MIXMA014
October 31, 2009	SonicC	Stickin’	MIXMA015
November 24, 2009	Laidback Luke & Gregor Salto Ft. Mavis Acquah	Step By Step/Shine Your Light	MIXMA016
January 7, 2010	Sandro Silva	Prom Night	MIXMA017
January 28, 2010	Oliver Twizt	Gangsterdam	MIXMA018
March 22, 2010	Laidback Luke Ft. Jonathan Mendelsohn	Till Tonight	MIXMA019
April 11, 2010	Marc Benjamin	Road Trip	MIXMA020
April 23, 2010	Tai	Rocking the Set	MIXMA021
May 27, 2010	Nouveau Yorican	Jackit	MIXMA022
June 10, 2010	Alex Armes	No Reasons	MIXMA023
July 12, 2010	DJ Manie Ft. Casablanca Connect	Kiesz	MIXMA024
July 22, 2010	Various	Mixmash Festival Anthems	MIXMA025
August 26, 2010	Sven Kirchhof	Limit Is The Sky	MIXMA026
September 2, 2010	Various	Dancefloor Destroyers	MIXMA027
September 16, 2010	Alan Made	Show You How	MIXMA028
October 7, 2010	Swanky Tunes	Across The Light	MIXMA029
November 8, 2010	Laidback Luke	Timebomb (Instrumental)	MIXMA030
December 14, 2010	Laidback Luke Ft. Jonathan Mendelsohn	Timebomb	MIXMA031
			MIXMA032
January 5, 2011	Junior Sanchez	Weee! (Play Da Rave)	MIXMA033
January 31, 2011	Swiss Official & Lorcan Mak	Back2Back Series Vol 01	MIXMA034
February 14, 2011	Angger Dimas & Sandro Silva	Back2Back Series Vol 02	MIXMA035
February 28, 2011	Laidback Luke & Steve Aoki Ft. Lil Jon	Turbulence	MIXMA036
March 14, 2011	Swanky Tunes Ft. Mr V.I.	Together	MIXMA037
March 28, 2011	La Fuente	Bang Bang	MIXMA038
April 11, 2011	Quintino & Apster	Music Oh	MIXMA039
April 25, 2011	Billy the Klit & Dani L. Mebius	Kniftig	MIXMA040
April 28, 2011	Quintino & Apster	Music Oh (Remixes)	MIXMA041
May 2, 2011	Laidback Luke & Steve Aoki Ft. Lil Jon	Turbulence (Remixes)	MIXMA042
May 12, 2011	Various	Dancefloor Destroyers 2	MIXMA043
May 16, 2011	Billy the Klit & Dani L. Mebius	Kniftig (Remixes)	MIXMA044
May 26, 2011	CZR, Paul Anthony & ZXX	Understand	MIXMA045
June 6, 2011	Richard Vission	Boombaa EP	MIXMA046
June 16, 2011	Sunnery James & Ryan Marciano	We Are	MIXMA047
June 27, 2011	GTA	U&I/Next To Us	MIXMA048
July 4, 2011	Sunnery James & Ryan Marciano	We Are (Remixes)	MIXMA049
July 11, 2011	Laidback Luke	Natural Disaster (Instrumental)	MIXMA050
July 21, 2011	Micky Slim	I'm A Freak	MIXMA051
July 27, 2011	Fadi	Ticket To The Sky	MIXMA052
August 8, 2011	Martin Volt	Ode To Sweden	MIXMA053
August 18, 2011	Earl Da Grey & Lazy Ants	Back2Back Series Vol 03	MIXMA054
September 5, 2011	Jay Robinson	Optimal Grime EP	MIXMA055
September 22, 2011	Revero	Some Sort Of Love/You Are Mine	MIXMA056
September 26, 2011	Patric La Funk Ft. Grace Regine	Time and Time Again	MIXMA057
October 6, 2011	Laidback Luke vs. Example	Natural Disaster	MIXMA058
October 13, 2011	Blink, Gianni Marino & Metsi	Bahasa	MIXMA059
November 7, 2011	La Fuente	No Boundaries	MIXMA060
November 17, 2011	Avesta & B Valley	Dutchano (Laidback Luke Edit)	MIXMA061
November 20, 2011	Laidback Luke & Sander van Doorn	Who's Wearing The Cap	MIXMA062
November 28, 2011	LOOPERS	Amnesia	MIXMA063
December 4, 2011	Laidback Luke & Sander van Doorn	Who's Wearing The Cap (Remixes)	MIXMA064
December 8, 2011	Angger Dimas	Kitchen EP	MIXMA065
December 19, 2011	Mata	Dutchness	MIXMA066
December 29, 2011	Austin Leeds & Dyro	Back2Back Series Vol 04	MIXMA067
January 9, 2012	Tommy Trash	Sex Drugs Rock N Roll	MIXMA068
January 19, 2012	Aaron Smith Ft. Luvli	Dancin’ (Laidback Luke Remix)	MIXMA069
January 30, 2012	Nash One & Michael De Kooker	Back2Back Series Vol 05	MIXMA070
February 9, 2012	Various	The Ones To Look Out For EP Vol 1	MIXMA071
February 20, 2012	Laidback Luke, Arno Cost & Norman Doray	Trilogy	MIXMA072
March 6, 2012	Various	The Ones To Watch EP Vol 2	MIXMA073
March 8, 2012	Laidback Luke, Arno Cost & Norman Doray	Trilogy (Remixes)	MIXMA074
March 12, 2012	Laidback Luke ft. Wynter Gordon	Speak Up	MIXMA075
March 26, 2012	Laidback Luke ft. Wynter Gordon	Speak Up (Remixes)	MIXMA076
April 5, 2012	Sandro Silva & Oliver Twizt	Gladiator	MIXMA077
April 16, 2012	Vato Gonzalez	Blow Ya Stereo	MIXMA078
April 20, 2012	Sandro Silva & Oliver Twizt	Gladiator (Remixes)	MIXMA079
April 26, 2012	Avesta	Rolling	MIXMA080
May 7, 2012	Laidback Luke ft. Chuckie & Martin Solveig	1234	MIXMA081
May 17, 2012	Dyro & LOOPERS	Monster Talk	MIXMA082
May 28, 2012	Various	The Ones To Watch EP Vol 3	MIXMA083
June 7, 2012	Laidback Luke ft. Martel	We Are The Stars	MIXMA084
June 18, 2012	Revero	Night In Moscow EP	MIXMA085
July 2, 2012	Laidback Luke ft. Martel	We Are The Stars (Remixes)	MIXMA086
July 5, 2012	Various	The Ones To Watch EP Vol 4	MIXMA087
July 12, 2012	Gregor Salto	Azumba	MIXMA088
July 27, 2012	Mitch De Klein	Strafwerk EP	MIXMA089
August 6, 2012	Sandro Silva & Oliver Twizt ft. Elleah	Pull The Trigger (Gladiator)	MIXMA090
July 31, 2012	Laidback Luke & Angger Dimas	Night Like This (Instrumental)	MIXMA091
August 13, 2012	Various	The Ones To Watch EP Vol. 5	MIXMA092
August 20, 2012	Laidback Luke & Angger Dimas ft. Polina	Night Like This	MIXMA093
August 27, 2012	Austin Leeds ft. Jason Caesar	Close Your Eyes	MIXMA094
July 30, 2012	Micky Slim ft. Majestic	Dirty Freak	MIXMA095
September 6, 2012	Laidback Luke & Angger Dimas ft. Polina	Night Like This (Remixes)	MIXMA096
September 10, 2012	Various	The Ones To Watch EP Vol. 6	MIXMA097
September 17, 2012	Austin Leeds ft. Jason Caesar	Close Your Eyes (Laidback Luke Remix)	MIXMA098
September 24, 2012	Alvaro	Pay Attention To The Drums	MIXMA099
October 11, 2012	DBN ft. Oni Sky	Gotta Get Thru This	MIXMA100
October 15, 2012	Mickey Fortune	Jock Jamz EP	MIXMA101
October 20, 2012	Various	Dancefloor Destroyers 3	MIXMA102
October 29, 2012	John Dahlbäck	Get Wild	MIXMA103
November 5, 2012	Various	The Ones To Watch EP Vol. 7	MIXMA104
November 12, 2012	Ansol vs. Dzeko & Torres	Y3AH!	MIXMA105
November 19, 2012	Laidback Luke & Lee Mortimer	Strobelight	MIXMA106
November 26, 2012	Wax Motif ft. Madame Buttons	Never Fall Again	MIXMA107
December 3, 2012	D-Rashid & Blasterjaxx	Reborn EP	MIXMA108
December 10, 2012	Kriss-One	March Of The Squirrel Monkey EP	MIXMA109
December 17, 2012	Tom Staar	Kingdom	MIXMA110
December 24, 2012	Dero	Bombard3ro	MIXMA111
January 7, 2013	GTA	Ai Novinha EP	MIXMA112
January 10, 2013	Tom Staar	Kingdom (Remixes)	MIXMA113
January 14, 2013	Rene Amesz	Rock With Me EP	MIXMA114
January 21, 2013	Various	Mixmash Trap EP	MIXMA115
January 28, 2013	Oliver Twizt	Let Me See You Do It	MIXMA116
February 4, 2013	Laidback Luke ft. Majestic	Pogo (Dub Mix)	MIXMA117
February 11, 2013	Gregor Salto & Funkin Matt	Foxy	MIXMA118
February 18, 2013	Various	The Ones To Watch EP Vol. 8	MIXMA119
March 4, 2013	Laidback Luke ft. Majestic	Pogo	MIXMA120
March 15, 2013	Uberjak’d	Bomber EP	MIXMA121
March 18, 2013	Marc Benjamin	Surrender EP	MIXMA122
March 25, 2013	La Fuente & Jamie Murray	Buzzing	MIXMA123
April 8, 2013	Henrix	Rock This Dream EP	MIXMA124
April 22, 2013	Laidback Luke & Hardwell	Dynamo	MIXMA125
May 6, 2013	Chocolate Puma	2000 People	MIXMA126
May 20, 2013	Deorro ft. Adrian Delgado	Let Me Love You	MIXMA127
May 30, 2013	Uberjak’d ft. Nuthin’ Under A Million	All I Need (Bomber)	MIXMA128
June 3, 2013	Laidback Luke & Hardwell	Dynamo (Remixes)	MIXMA129
June 17, 2013	Moska & Jordan Ferrer ft. Rossi	Massive Mutation	MIXMA130
June 24, 2013	Audiobot	iHouse 2.0	MIXMA131
July 1, 2013	Laidback Luke vs. Dimitri Vegas & Like Mike	More	MIXMA132
July 15, 2013	Gregor Salto & Wiwek	Intimi	MIXMA133
July 29, 2013	Laidback Luke vs. Dimitri Vegas & Like Mike	More (Remixes)	MIXMA134
August 12, 2013	Revero & Jonathan Pitch ft. Alicia Madison	The Other Side (Tick Tick)	MIXMA135
August 26, 2013	Blasterjaxx	Koala (Remixes)	MIXMA136
September 1, 2013	D.O.D	Bananas	MIXMA137
September 16, 2013	La Fuente & 2 Faced Funks	Home Run	MIXMA138
September 30, 2013	Ansol & Ken Loi ft. Mina	Knock Down	MIXMA139
October 28, 2013	Martin Solveig & Laidback Luke	Blow	MIXMA140
November 11, 2013	D.O.D	Bananas (Remixes)	MIXMA141
November 25, 2013	Wiwek & Cesqeaux	Ritual	MIXMA142
December 16, 2013	Promise Land ft. Alicia Madison	Sun Shine Down (Laidback Luke Edit)	MIXMA143
December 30, 2013	Laidback Luke & Peking Duk	Mufasa	MIXMA144
January 13, 2014	D.O.D	Stomp	MIXMA145
January 27, 2014	Laidback Luke & Project 46 ft. Collin McLoughlin	Collide	MIXMA146
February 10, 2014	Tujamo	Hey Mister	MIXMA147
February 24, 2014	D-Rashid	Famous EP	MIXMA148
March 3, 2014	Laidback Luke & Project 46 ft. Collin McLoughlin	Collide (Remixes)	MIXMA149
March 10, 2014	Tujamo	Hey Mister (Tujamo's Club Mix)	MIXMA150
March 10, 2014	Promise Land ft. Alicia Madison	Sun Shine Down (Remixes)	MIXMA151
March 24, 2014	Chocolate Puma ft. Kris Kiss	Step Back	MIXMA152
April 7, 2014	Shelco Garcia & Teenwolf	Make Me Jump	MIXMA153
April 21, 2014	Laidback Luke & D.O.D	Flashing Lights	MIXMA154
May 5, 2014	Avesta	Roller Coaster	MIXMA155
May 19, 2014	Sandro Silva & D.O.D ft. Nuthin’ Under A Million	Chasing Dreams	MIXMA156
June 2, 2014	Laidback Luke & Marc Benjamin ft. Nuthin’ Under A Million	We’re Forever	MIXMA157
June 16, 2014	Shelco Garcia & Teenwolf	That's My Jam	MIXMA158
June 30, 2014	D.O.D	Steel Drum	MIXMA159
July 14, 2014	Blasterjaxx	Legend Comes To Life	MIXMA160
July 28, 2014	Laidback Luke ft. Gina Turner	Bae	MIXMA161
August 4, 2014	Revero	Eternal	MIXMA162
August 26, 2014	Laidback Luke & Marc Benjamin ft. Nuthin’ Under A Million	We’re Forever (Remixes)	MIXMA163
September 1, 2014	Marc Benjamin ft. Nuthin’ Under A Million	City Lights	MIXMA164
September 15, 2014	Uberjak’d ft. Nuthin’ Under A Million	Back 2 Life	MIXMA165
September 29, 2014	Slider & Magnit vs. Robero ft. Louise Carver	Price You Pay (Laidback Luke Edit)	MIXMA166
October 6, 2014	Solidisco & Fireflowerz	Unreal	MIXMA167
October 20, 2014	Laidback Luke	Stepping To The Beat	MIXMA168
November 3, 2014	D.O.D	Do Your Thing	MIXMA169
November 17, 2014	Shelco Garcia & Teenwolf vs. Type3Species ft. Nuthin Under A Million	Run To You	MIXMA170
December 1, 2014	Gonso Rivas & Sergei Rez	Stop The Whistle	MIXMA171
December 15, 2014	Double Cream	Cairo	MIXMA172
January 5, 2015	Laidback Luke & Tujamo	S.A.X.	MIXMA173
January 19, 2015	Dave Silcox & D.O.D ft. Little Nikki	All Or Nothing	MIXMA174
February 2, 2015	DBN vs. Jordan Ferrer ft. Oni Sky	Gotta Get Thru This 2015	MIXMA175
February 16, 2015	Laidback Luke ft. MC Goodgrip	Rocking With The Best (Tujamo Remix)	MIXMA176
March 16, 2015	D.O.D	Temper	MIXMA177
March 30, 2015	Henrix & Bream ft. Zashanell	Alright	MIXMA178
April 13, 2015	Angger Dimas ft. Luciana	Zombie	MIXMA179
April 27, 2015	Tom Tyger & Florian Picasso	Can't Stop	MIXMA180
May 11, 2015	Laidback Luke & Shelco Garcia & Teenwolf	XXX	MIXMA181
May 25, 2015	Various	Mixmash Deep Selection	MIXMA182
June 23, 2015	Steve Angello & Laidback Luke ft. Robin S.	Show Me Love (2015 Remixes)	MIXMA183
June 22, 2015	Sultan + Shepard	In The Night	MIXMA184
July 6, 2015	Shelco Garcia & Teenwolf vs. Juyen Sebulba vs. Wallstreet ft. Hawkboy	Dance	MIXMA185
July 20, 2015	Laidback Luke & Chocolate Puma	Snap That Neck	MIXMA186
August 3, 2015	Laidback Luke	Break Down The House (D.O.D Remix)	MIXMA187
August 17, 2015	Laidback Luke & Moska ft. Terri B!	Get It Right	MIXMA188
August 31, 2015	Shelco Garcia & Teenwolf	Stuck In My Head	MIXMA189
September 14, 2015	Inpetto	Needin’ U So	MIXMA190
September 28, 2015	D.O.D	Those	MIXMA191
October 12, 2015	Laidback Luke ft. Trevor Guthrie	Let It Go	MIXMA192
October 26, 2015	Sultan + Shepard ft. Lauren Mason	Chasing (In The Night) (Remixes)	MIXMA193
March 2, 2015	Laidback Luke ft. MC Goodgrip	Rocking With The Best (2K15 Remix)	MIXMA194
November 16, 2015	Sultan + Shepard & Felix Leiter	BWU	MIXMA195
November 30, 2015	Inpetto	Lifting	MIXMA196
December 14, 2015	Florian Picasso	FRFX	MIXMA197
December 24, 2015	Inpetto	I Need To Know	MIXMA198
January 11, 2016	D.O.D	Pull Up	MIXMA199
February 8, 2016	Laidback Luke & GTA ft. Aruna	The Chase	MIXMA200
February 22, 2016	Shelco Garcia & Teenwolf ft. Philly K	Blow Up	MIXMA201
March 7, 2016	Inpetto	How We Used To Do	MIXMA202
March 21, 2016	Helena Legend	Pisalda	MIXMA203
April 4, 2016	D.O.D	Night Cap	MIXMA204
April 18, 2016	Helena Legend	Pisalda (Inpetto Remix)	MIXMA205
May 2, 2016	Mark Villa	Venture	MIXMA206
May 16, 2016	Inpetto & Johnny Bravo ft. Kelli-Leigh	U Got A Friend	MIXMA207
May 30, 2016	Shelco Garcia & Teenwolf ft. Philly K & Madi Rindge	Dreaming	MIXMA208
June 13. 2016	Inpetto	Needin’ U So (Remixes)	MIXMA209
July 4, 2016	Laidback Luke & twoloud	Fcukin Beats	MIXMA210
July 15, 2016	Lady Bee ft. Grace Tither	Homeless Heart	MIXMA211
July 25, 2016	Inpetto ft. Lauren Mason	Need More	MIXMA212
August 5, 2016	Laidback Luke & Yves V ft. Hawkboy	To The Beat	MIXMA213
August 22, 2016	Mark Villa	No Mercy	MIXMA214
September 5, 2016	Lady Bee ft. Grace Tither	Homeless Heart (Remixes)	MIXMA215
September 19, 2016	Inpetto & Hits O Good ft. Neta	Nowhere To Be Found	MIXMA216
October 3, 2016	Pyrodox ft. Ina	Never Let Me Go	MIXMA217
October 10, 2016	Inpetto & Hits O Good ft. Neta	Nowhere To Be Found (Hits O Good Remix)	MIXMA218
October 31, 2016	Inpetto	Million Miles	MIXMA219
November 14, 2016	Ralvero ft. Ina	Run Wild	MIXMA220
November 28, 2016	Inpetto	Million Miles (Remixes)	MIXMA221
December 12, 2016	Shelco Garcia & Teenwolf ft. Leelee Haxi	Sky High	MIXMA222

=== Ones To Watch Records ===
Release date	Artist	Title	Catalogue No.
March 21, 2013	Blasterjaxx	Koala EP	OTW001
March 28, 2013	Jonathan Pitch	Hands Up EP	OTW002
April 11, 2013	Justin Strikes	Outburst	OTW003
April 18, 2013	D.O.D	More Cowbell EP	OTW004
April 22, 2013	DJ Dstar & Matthew LeFace	Outlawz EP	OTW005
May 8, 2013	Saint Liz	Medusa EP	OTW006
May 23, 2013	Koele Vaten	Epos One EP	OTW007
May 23, 2013	Lucky Charmes, Tony Verdult, Andy Callister	Aurora/Kick Out The Jamz	OTW008
May 31, 2013	MataLive	Indigo EP	OTW009
June 6, 2013	Marc Benjamin	The Crash EP	OTW010
June 20, 2013	D.O.D	Fire EP	OTW011
June 27, 2013	Lucien Foort	DTFB	OTW012
July 4, 2013	Kenneth G	Basskikker	OTW013
July 4, 2013	Will Sparks & Joel Fletcher	Bring It Back	OTW014
July 11, 2013	Florian Picasso	Artemis	OTW015
July 18, 2013	Alexander Technique & Disco Killah ft. Luca Masini	Skyscraper	OTW016
July 25, 2013	LOOPERS	Propaganda EP	OTW017
August 1, 2013	Sven Kirchhof	Dual	OTW018
August 15, 2013	Artistic Raw & DJ Irwan	Pump Up The Volume	OTW019
August 22, 2013	Alex Guesta & Stefano Pain ft. Yang King	Bring That Noize	OTW020
August 28, 2013	Dazepark & Brendon	Right Now	OTW021
August 30, 2013	DJ Rockid	Yo Pow EP	OTW022
September 5, 2013	Rico Tubbs & Heavy Weight DJs	The Anthem	OTW023
September 5, 2013	4Tezian	Scorpion	OTW024
September 12, 2013	Gusto	I Am	OTW025
September 19, 2013	Shelco Garcia & Teenwolf ft. Tittsworth	House Party EP	OTW026
September 19, 2013	Oh Snap & Enferno	Cavaricci	OTW027
September 26, 2013	Lunde Bros	321	OTW028
October 3, 2013	Dave Silcox	Voodoo EP	OTW029
October 10, 2013	Juyen Sebulba	Kaanga EP	OTW030
October 17, 2013	Alean & Skyy Vs. Trifo	Nuke	OTW031
October 17, 2013	Lucky Charmes & Howard D	Pyro EP	OTW032
October 24, 2013	Eddie Deng	Fire!	OTW033
October 31, 2013	Marc Benjamin	Break It Down	OTW034
November 7, 2013	Franko Ovalles & Antoine Delvig	Huh EP	OTW035
November 8, 2013	John Ross	Distoma EP	OTW036
November 18, 2013	Howard D	DJHereWeGo	OTW037
November 22, 2013	Kriss-One	Racehov EP	OTW038
December 5, 2013	Sam O Neall	Volta	OTW039
December 12, 2013	Mitch De Klein ft. Gina Turner	Krew	OTW040
December 19, 2013	Shelco Garcia & Teenwolf Vs. Wallstreet	King Cobra	OTW041
January 2, 2014	Delivio Reavon & Aaron Gill	Kickdrum	OTW042
January 9, 2014	Gina Turner	Shake/Oscillator EP	OTW043
January 16, 2014	Ruben Kusters	Hall Dance	OTW044
January 16, 2014	Dave Till & Krewzell ft. Jason Thurell	We Are Out Of Control	OTW045
January 23, 2014	Revolvr	Almost Home EP	OTW046
January 30, 2014	Ziggy & Saint Liz	Mojo	OTW047
February 6, 2014	Frank Caro & Alemany	Helicon	OTW048
February 13, 2014	Invalyd ft. Jonny Rose	Let Your Heart Go (Laidback Luke Edit)	OTW049
February 21, 2014	Herve Pagez	Yo Ready	OTW050
February 27, 2014	Tom Tyger	Africa	OTW051
March 6, 2014	Daniel Wanrooy & JOOP	Source Selected	OTW052
March 13, 2014	Henrix & Twinz Beats	Panty Dropper	OTW053
March 20, 2014	Victor Niglio & Junkie Kidd	STFU	OTW054
March 27, 2014	Teo Moss	Punk	OTW055
April 10, 2014	St. Elm8 ft. Nuthin’ Under A Million	I'm A Criminal	OTW056
April 17, 2014	Herve Pagez ft. Jalise Romy	Take Control	OTW057
April 24, 2014	The Trixx ft. Nuthin’ Under A Million	Forever	OTW058
April 24, 2014	Ollie Jones	Fanfare EP	OTW059
May 1, 2014	Henrix	Shake Your Money Maker	OTW060
May 8, 2014	MataLive	Miami	OTW061
May 15, 2014	Moska	Get Down	OTW062
May 22, 2014	Tom Tyger	Cold	OTW063
May 29, 2014	Oliver Twizt	High	OTW064
June 5, 2014	Victor Niglio & Happy Colors	Jungle	OTW065
June 19, 2014	Funkin Matt	Raise The Roof	OTW066
June 26, 2014	Badd Dimes	That Beat	OTW067
July 3, 2014	Rave Radio	Rumble	OTW068
July 10, 2014	Jaz Von D	Fear Of Silence	OTW069
July 17, 2014	Ibranovski	Momentum	OTW070
July 24, 2014	LOOPERS	Seoul	OTW071
July 31, 2014	Dave Silcox	Spark It Up	OTW072
July 31, 2014	Yonathan Zvi	BAMF EP	OTW073
August 7, 2014	Juyen Sebulba	Wild	OTW074
August 14, 2014	DBN & SESA	EMO	OTW075
August 21, 2014	Dave Till & Tyler Ace	Desert Storm	OTW076
August 29, 2014	Tom Enzy & Trifo	The Kids	OTW077
September 4, 2014	Rezone	Moogulator	OTW078
September 11, 2014	Bass Kleph & Audex	Somebody Shoulda Told You	OTW079
September 18, 2014	Dazepark	Revenge	OTW080
September 25, 2014	Ale Mora, Karmatek & Double U	Rollin	OTW081
October 2, 2014	Ollie Jones	Lights	OTW082
October 9, 2014	Harrys & Fly	Jag War	OTW083
October 16, 2014	Franko Ovalles & Marcio Lama	MNDFNK	OTW084
October 23, 2014	Herve Pagez	Paaarty	OTW085
October 30, 2014	Moska	Bring Back The Dutch	OTW086
November 6, 2014	Rene Kuppens	Meltdown	OTW087
November 13, 2014	Ken Loi, Jason Taylor & Lodato	LMSYH	OTW088
November 20, 2014	Frank Caro & Alemany	Nights	OTW089
November 27, 2014	Jacob van Hage & Asonn	Drumrave	OTW090
December 4, 2014	LOOPERS	Steeze	OTW091
December 11, 2014	The Trixx ft. Jonny Rose	Too Close	OTW092
December 18, 2014	John Ross & Luke Carpenter	Holding Hands	OTW093
January 1, 2015	Jordan Ferrer	Now	OTW094
January 15, 2015	Badd Dimes & Billy The Kit	We Are	OTW095
January 29, 2015	Ibranovski & Loken	Hayabusa	OTW096
February 12, 2015	Uberjak'd & DJ Bam Bam	Bamjak'd	OTW097
February 26, 2015	Justin Prime & Neple	Crank It Up!	OTW098
March 12, 2015	Gianni Marino & Abirama	Wrath Of The Pharaoh	OTW099
March 23, 2015	Laidback Luke & Angger Dimas ft. Mina	Beat Of The Drum	OTW100
April 6, 2015	Scales ft. Zack Knight	Green Eyes	OTW101
April 20, 2015	Juyen Sebulba & Herve Pagez	This Way	OTW102
May 4, 2015	Promise Land ft. Shawnee Taylor	Faithfully	OTW103
May 18, 2015	Valentino Khaynus & Kit Sunders	Insignia	OTW104
June 1, 2015	Blazetools & Kirill Slepuha	Bloodline	OTW105
June 15, 2015	Adam Aesalon & Murat Salman	Dawn	OTW106
June 29, 2015	Nebuer & The Dead Prezidents	Opium	OTW107
July 13, 2015	Invalyd ft. Steflang	All Or Nothing	OTW108
July 27, 2015	Trifo & Manuel Galey	Crazy Carnival	OTW109
August 10, 2015	DBN & Tony Romera	Gorilla	OTW110
August 24, 2015	Audiobot & Vassy	Million Pieces	OTW111
September 7, 2015	Justin Strikes	Orion	OTW112
September 21, 2015	Revero	Loco	OTW113
October 5, 2015	Ruben Kusters & Cagarro	Selectah	OTW114
October 19, 2015	Evangelos	VNGLS	OTW115
November 9, 2015	DBN	Mosquito	OTW116
November 23, 2015	JSH	212	OTW117
December 7, 2015	Sheni Doko	Hands Up	OTW118
December 21, 2015	Justin Strikes x Aymso & Kalen	Jungle EP	OTW119
January 4, 2016	Evangelos	WCFY	OTW120
			OTW121
January 18, 2016	Juyen Sebulba	Hot Shower	OTW122
February 1, 2016	Sheni Doko	Twitch	OTW123
February 15, 2016	Stoltenhoff	Tuddle McBuddle	OTW124
February 29, 2016	Subchock & Evangelos ft. M.I.M.E.	Vindictae	OTW125
March 14, 2016	Bora	Mawkundhu	OTW126
March 28, 2016	KANDY	Flavors EP	OTW127
April 11, 2016	Dirtcaps	Baritone	OTW128
April 25, 2016	Funky Craig	Drums Of War	OTW129
May 9, 2016	Juyen Sebulba	Blow Your Speakerz EP	OTW130
May 23, 2016	Sheni Doko & Gianka	The Drum	OTW131
June 6, 2016	Funky Craig	Spice	OTW132
June 20, 2016	Out Of Cookies	Fugazy	OTW133
July 5, 2016	Juyen Sebulba & Stoltenhoff	Banana Ice Cream	OTW134
July 18, 2016	Subshock & Evangelos	NGAF	OTW135
August 1, 2016	Out Of Cookies	Who's Them Boyz	OTW136
August 15, 2016	Lady Bee x Rocky Wellstack	Box Dem EP	OTW137
August 29, 2016	BSNO X Noizekid	Fuego	OTW138
September 12, 2016	Selecta	Turbo	OTW139
September 26, 2016	Key Noise	So Deep	OTW140
October 24, 2016	Out Of Cookies	Front To Back	OTW141
November 7, 2016	Funky Craig	Wakizashi	OTW142
November 21, 2016	ËMMË x Erotic Cafe ft. Kg Man	Tun Up	OTW143
December 5, 2016	Stoltenhoff & Holly	Thunderstorm	OTW144
December 19, 2016	Henrix	She Wanna Dolla	OTW145

=== Mixmash Deep ===
Release date	Artist	Title	Catalogue No.
July 16, 2015	Tank & Cheetah ft. Niles Mason	Luxury	MMD001
August 13, 2015	Inpetto ft. David Spekter	Learn To Fly	MMD002
September 10, 2015	Patrick Hagenaar	Happy Vibes	MMD003
September 24, 2015	Tank & Cheetah	Luxury (The Remixes)	MMD004
November 26, 2015	Pnut & Jelly	Second Chances	MMD005
December 10, 2015	Hits 'O' Good	Moments	MMD006
January 7, 2016	Tank & Cheetah X DBN ft. The Rise	Trust	MMD007
January 21, 2016	Hits 'O' Good	Right Time	MMD008
February 4, 2016	Jack Wins	Give It Up	MMD009
February 18, 2016	NuKid	Blast	MMD010
March 17, 2016	Pnut & Jelly ft. Sean Declase	100 Degrees	MMD011
March 31, 2016	Fadi & Klinko	Promises	MMD012
April 14, 2016	Tank & Cheetah X DBN ft. The Rise	Trust (The Remixes)	MMD013
April 28, 2016	Jack Wins	Give It Up (The Remixes)	MMD014
May 12, 2016	Patrick Hagenaar ft. Sweedish	Disarm	MMD015
May 26, 2016	Aaron Jackson ft. Megan Hamilton	Told You So	MMD016
June 9, 2016	Fadi & Klinko	Broken Hearted	MMD017
June 23, 2016	Jack Wins ft. Katt Rose	Slave 2 Love	MMD018
July 7, 2016	Niko The Kid X Halogen	Tell Me	MMD019
July 21, 2016	Kross ft. Laura Brehm	Won't You	MMD020
August 18, 2016	A Tigers Blood	Elegant	MMD021
September 15, 2016	Mark & Prince x Feider ft. Philly K.	Love Is So Painful	MMD022
September 29, 2016	Roulsen x East & Young	Summer	MMD023
October 27, 2016	NuKid	Grindin'	MMD024
November 10, 2016	Andy Bianchini & Rivas (BR)	Disconap	MMD025
November 24, 2016	Jack Wins ft. Francci Richard	I Used To Love You	MMD026
December 8, 2016	Subshock & Evangelos	Don't Stop	MMD027
December 22, 2016	Patrick Hagenaar ft. Sweedish	Disarm (Tank & Cheetah Remix)	MMD028
