= Rezone =

Russian DJ & music producer (born 1985)

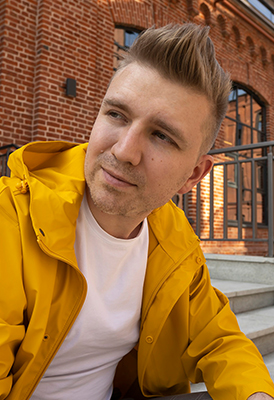

Background information
- Also known as: Jake Anderson, Re-Zone
- Born: Yakov Morozov; 1985 (age 40–41); Russia
- Genres: Progressive house; tech house; electro house
- Occupations: DJ; record producer
- Years active: 2006–present
- Website: djrezone.com

Yakov Morozov (born 6 August 1985), better known by his stage name Rezone, is a Russian DJ, music producer and sound designer.

== Musical career ==
Yakov was just 13 years old when he first tried to write electronic music. Since then all his free time between basketball training sessions was devoted to creating tracks.

In 2006, Rezone released his debut single "Money!". In the same year, the composition "128 Bass Killers Attack the Pop Industry" saw success.

In 2007, the track "Tribute to Mr. Toca of Revenge of a Bass Killer" was played in the mixes and radio shows by Bob Sinclar, Steve Lawler, and Benny Benassi.

In 2008, Yakov released his first studio album Follow Me consisting of 13 tracks, the single "Singomakers" and collaborated with Afroboogie on the track "Twisted". In the same year, Rezone debuted at the 24th position in the ranking of the Top 100 DJs of Russia.

In 2009, Rezone won the remix contest for the track "Mannheim" by Mark Knight and became the first Russian artist of Toolroom Records. On July 15 of the same year, a remix of the track "Eclipse" by Reza was released. This work was supported by Pete Tong in the radio show Essential Selection on BBC Radio 1.

In September 2010, Rezone released his second album The Best Remixes from Rezone.

In 2011, Rezone won the DJ Magazine and Nowtrax remix competition 'Remix Your Way to Asia' with the track "Pentonville Blues" by Boy George, Glide & Swerve, and played at the Lotus club in Macau at DJ Mag's official party.

In 2011, the CD single of Salme Dahlstrom's "C'Mon Y'All" including the Rezone Remix entered the Billboard charts.

In 2012, Rezone created the sound design label Singomakers, whose sounds are used in various well-known compositions, films, and TV shows.

In 2012, Dutch music channel Dancetrippin TV recorded the live set of Rezone at Kazantip Festival for episode #189.

In September 2014, Rezone released the track "Moogulator" on Mixmash Records, the record label of Dutch DJ/producer Laidback Luke, and the track "Bounce" on British label CR2 Records.

In 2015, Yakov released "Freak You Well" and a cover version of Depeche Mode's "Enjoy the Silence".

In November 2015, Rezone launched his Rezonance radio show.

In October 2016, Rezone remixed the track "The Hypnotist" together with Zen Freeman and British hypnotist Paul McKenna.

In 2017, Rezone released "Alco-Shopoholic", featuring blogger and singer Trev Li, on Canadian label Big Fish Recordings.

In 2018, Rezone released "Dirty Style", a collaboration with Twin Scream. Ahead of the official release, Laidback Luke made an unofficial remix of it and played it regularly during performances at Tomorrowland, Ultra Music Festival, and EDC.

On September 7, 2019, Rezone released an official remix of "3Acid3" by French DJ/producer Joachim Garraud.

=== Singles and collaborations ===
Title	Artist	Label	Release date
Fluids	Rezone	Undgrd Music	2019-05-03
Dirty Style	Rezone, Twin Scream	Rezonance	2018-02-05
Alco-Shopoholic	Rezone	Big Fish Recordings	2017-12-25
Changes	Rezone, Incognet, Yana Blinder	S2 Records	2016-12-05
Bounce	Rezone	Cr2 Records	2014-09-15
Moogulator	Rezone	Ones To Watch Records (Mixmash)	2014-09-04
Bass Drums Funktion One	Rezone	BugEyed Records	2013-11-18
Back in Time	Rezone, Thomas Penton	Black Hole Recordings	2013-04-01
Clubbed To Death	Rezone	BugEyed Records	2012-09-05
Growth Again	Rezone, Nopopstar	Black Hole Recordings	2012-03-12
Dark Side Slave	Rezone	Rezone Records	2011-09-19
Time	Rezone, Anton Neumark	Rezone Records	2011-06-20
Out Of Limits	Rezone, Ben Coda	Enormous Tunes	2011-06-10
One Love, One Life, One Fate	Rezone, Zmey, Alisa Romanova	Avanti	2011-05-16
The Best Remixes From Re-Zone (Part 2)	Rezone	Rezone Records	2011-04-19
House Of Brass	Rezone	Avanti	2010-11-15
The Best Remixes From Re-Zone (Part 1)	Rezone	Rezone Records	2010-09-20
Russian Railways	Rezone, Tesla	1605	2010-09-01
Melody Of My Heart	Rezone	Rezone records	2010-03-24
Unite	Rezone, Afroboogie	Stereo Seven	2010-02-23
Sunset At Kazantip	Rezone	Electric Candy	2009-12-02
Tweak	Rezone, Reactor 13 James Harcourt	Big & Dirty (Be Yourself Music)	2009-10-27
Freak The Speakers	Rezone	Miniaturesrec	2009-10-19
Choose	Rezone, Slava Shelest	System Recordings	2009-04-16
Show Me Love	Rezone	System Recordings	2008-11-17
Twisted	Rezone, Afroboogie	Whoop Digital	2008-10-09
Red Hot Chile Pepper	Rezone	System Recordings	2008-09-26
Follow Me Rezone	Rezone, DJ Marbrax	BugEyed Records	2008-07-16
Don't Wanna Be Your Prisoner	Rezone	BugEyed Records	2008-02-21
Tribute to Mr. Toca Of Revenge Of A Bass Killer	Rezone	BugEyed Records	2007-10-04
Mirages	Rezone	iRecords (iRecords)	2007-07-02
Try#2	Rezone	iRecords (iRecords)	2007-06-11
128 Bass Killers Attack The Pop Industry	Rezone	Mashtronic	2007-05-04
Reflection EP	Rezone, Samish	Oryx Music	2006-12-31
Money!	Rezone	Oryx Music	2006-10-05

=== Remixes ===
Artist	Title	Label	Release date
Joachim Garraud	3Acid3 (Rezone Remix)	UndGrd Music	2014-02-17
Zen Freeman, Paul McKenn	The Hypnotist (Rezone Remix)	Magik Muzik	2014-02-17
Patrick Hagenaar	Magik feat. Sarah McLeod (Rezone Remix)	Magik Muzik	2013-07-15
JES	Before You Go (Rezone Remix)	Magik Muzik	2012-09-17
Bobina	Quattro 372 (Rezone Remix)	Magik Muzik	2012-06-18
Mell Tierra	Eagle Beach (Rezone Remix)	Avanti	2012-02-20
Rosie Romero, Kyfu	Black Magic (Rezone Remix)	Avanti	2011-07-18
Derek Howell	Stride (Rezone Remix)	Plusquam EDM	2011-02-25
Discoscience	Iberian Girl (Rezone Remix)	Rezone Records	2011-02-15
Phunk Investigation	Tutan (Rezone Remix)	Avanti	2010-01-25
Harry Brown	Momentum (Rezone Remix)	Whoop Digital	2009-10-12
Moti Brothers	Secret Feelings (Rezone Remix)	Ready Mix Records	2009-10-10
Mark Knight	Mannheim (Rezone Remix)	Toolroom	2009-09-23
Reza	Eclipse (Rezone Remix)	Kinky Digital	2009-06-15
Boris	Tweaking (Afroboogie & Re-Zone Remix)	Stereo Productions	2008-09-04
James Harcourt	B*tch Tits (Rezone Remix)	BugEyed Records	2008-03-19
Jan Peters	Starfire (Rezone Remix)	Oryx Music	2006-10-12
