= Arno Cost =

French musician, DJ and record producer (born 1986)

- Also known as: The Freshmakers, Le Monde, Subaltern, BB Law
- Born: Vadim Arnaud Constentin; 6 August 1986 (age 39); Nogent-sur-Marne, Île-de-France, France
- Genres: House; progressive house; electro house
- Occupations: Disc jockey; record producer
- Years active: 2005–present
- Labels: Cr2 Records; Positiva Records; Serial Records; Size Records; Spinnin' Records; STMPD RCRDS

Vadim Arnaud Constentin (French pronunciation: [vadim aʁno kɔ̃stɑ̃tɛ̃]; born 6 August 1986 in Nogent-sur-Marne), better known by his stage name Arno Cost, is a French musician, DJ and record producer.

== Biography ==
Cost was born on 6 August 1986, in Nogent-sur-Marne. He starts his career in 1999 by creating his own music at home. His music is inspired by musical genres like pop music, italo disco, and the French house. His most influential were the French artists Daft Punk, Benjamin Diamond, Alan Braxe and contemporary Stuart Price, Axwell, Lifelike and Eric Prydz.

His first release was "Let U Go" and was released in 2006 by the label Serial Records, produced with his friends Norman Doray and Pierre de la Touche under the alias "The Freshmakers" managed to stay six consecutive weeks at number 1 French radio FG DJ Radio. Later he remixed "Under the Fuse of Love" by the French duo Geyster, with whom he reached the second position in the UK Club Charts for several weeks.

Cost began to gain a reputation in the scene through his work of 2007, "Magenta" composed alongside Arias. This production was remixed by the English DJ Dave Spoon and gained support from some of the world's most well-known DJs, including Pete Tong, Tom Novy, Steve Angello and Sebastian Ingrosso.

In late 2007, he released "Apocalypse", co-produced with his friend Norman Doray. It was remixed by French DJ Sébastien Léger and got good reception on the dance floor.

In 2008, he returned to the studio and produced the single "Golden Walls" with Swedish DJ John Dahlbäck as well as their own productions "Souvenir" and "Darling Harbour". With Norman Doray, Arno remixed three European electronic music labels like Ministry of Sound, Cr2 and Joia. His single Darling Harbour, was released in late 2008.

In recognition, in 2009 is called to mix a compilation for FG Club is an institution in French dance music. His previous sponsors of this album were David Guetta in 2008 and Antoine Clamaran in 2007.

In April 2009, he released "Cyan", always in the direction of his previous tracks. It was on this occasion that he will direct his first music video.

In 2011, he released "The Days to Come" on Atlantic Records, produced with his fellow Parisian DJ Arias. Arno gave another vision of music focused on his keen appreciation of melody and his innate ability to take control of the dance floor, receiving praise from artists like Pete Tong and David Guetta alike. " Lise " was released by Refune, Sebastian Ingrosso's label. In the same year, he was summoned to remix the single successful Titanium by David Guetta and Ready 2 Go by Martin Solveig.

In 2012, he joined the prestigious Mixmash Records label owner, Dutch DJ Laidback Luke and his friend Norman Doray to release "Trilogy".

== Discography ==
=== Extended plays ===
- 2016: Coming Alive (Protocol Recordings)

=== Charting singles ===
Year	Title	Peak chart positions												Album
Year	Title	AUS	AUT	BEL (Vl)	BEL (Wa)	FIN	FRA	GER	IRL	NLD	SWE	SWI	UK	Album
2006	"Under the Fuse of Love" (Arno Cost Remix) (with Geyster)	—	—	—	—	—	—	—	—	—	—	—	2	Non-album singles
2007	"Magenta" (with Arias)	—	—	9^{[A]}	—	—	—	—	—	—	—	—	—	Non-album singles
2008	"Golden Walls" (with John Dahlbäck)	—	—	10^{[A]}	—	—	—	—	—	—	—	—	—	Non-album singles
2008	"Souvenir"	—	—	4^{[A]}	—	—	—	—	—	—	—	—	—	Non-album singles
2010	"Cyan"	—	—	3^{[B]}	—	—	—	—	—	—	—	—	—	Non-album singles
2011	"The Days To Come" (with Arias featuring Michael Feiner)	—	—	15^{[C]}	8^{[C]}	—	—	—	—	—	—	—	—	Non-album singles
2012	"Trilogy" (with Laidback Luke and Norman Doray)	—	—	7^{[C]}	—	—	—	—	—	—	—	—	—	Non-album singles
2014	"Nightventure" (with Greg Cerrone)	—	—	5^{[C]}	3^{[C]}	—	—	—	—	—	—	—	—	Non-album singles
"—" denotes a recording that did not chart or was not released in that territory.

=== Singles ===
- 2005: Everywhere (Discogalaxy Records)
- 2006: Forever (featuring Distorded) (Pool e Music)
- 2006: Let U Go (as The Freshmakers) (Serial Records)
- 2006: Women (BB Law feat HenchMen) (D-Tracks)
- 2006: Magenta (featuring Arias) (Serial/CR2/Kontor/Airplay)
- 2007: Night Feelings (Serial Records, Serial)
- 2007: Apocalypse (featuring Norman Doray) (Serial/CR2/Kontor/Airplay)
- 2008: Souvenir (Cr2, Serial, Kontor and Airplay)
- 2008: Golden Walls (with John Dahlbäck) (Nero Records)
- 2009: Darling Harbour (Serial, Cr2 Records)
- 2009: Cyan (Serial, Cr2 Records)
- 2010: Arno Cost and Martin Solveig featuring Stephy Haik – Touch Me
- 2011: The Days To Come (with Arias featuring Michael Feiner) (Big Beat/Atlantic)
- 2011: Lise (Refune Records)
- 2011: Bymo (Serial Records)
- 2012: Trilogy (featuring Laidback Luke and Norman Doray) (Mixmash)
- 2012: Lifetime (Spinnin)
- 2013: Head Up (Size Records)
- 2013: Nightventure (with Greg Cerrone) (Size Records)
- 2014: Arno Cost and Norman Doray featuring Dev – Darkest Days (Apocalypse 2014) (Spinnin' Records)
- 2014: Strong (with Norman Doray) (Size Records)
- 2015: Paradisco (with Norman Doray featuring Ben Macklin) (Sosumi Records)
- 2015: At Night (with Arias) (Free download)
- 2015: Rising Love (with Norman Doray featuring Mike Taylor) (Thrilling Music)
- 2015: Waiting For You (featuring Chris Holsten) (Protocol Recordings)
- 2015: Return (Free Download)
- 2016: Again (featuring Eric Lumiere) (Enhanced Music)
- 2016: Still Alright (Free download)
- 2019: Together (with Norman Doray) (A Positiva / Virgin EMI Records)
- 2019: Travolta (with Norman Doray) [Stmpd Rcrds]
- 2019: Wanna Do (with Norman Doray) (Club Sweat)
- 2020: Darlin' (with Norman Doray) (A Positiva / Virgin EMI Records)
- 2020: One Night (with Norman Doray) (Stmpd Rcrds)
- 2021: Show Luv (with Norman Doray) (Spinnin' Records)

=== Remixes ===
2006:

- Geyster – Under the Fuse of Love (Arno Cost Remix) - Somekind Records
- Laidback Luke and Marchand Present Highstreets – Don't Let Go (Arno Cost Remix) - Ledge Music)
- Rilod – Thriller (The Freshmakers Remix) - Nice Music
- Da Sushiman – In & Out (The Freshmakers Remix) - Ledge Music
- Mathieu Bouthier and Muttonheads aka Serial Crew – Make Your Own Kind Of Music (The Frenchmakers Remix) - Serial Records

2007:

- Chris Kaeser featuring Rita Campbell – U Must Feel Something (Arno Cost and Distorded Remix) - In and Out
- Sunfreakz – Counting Down the Days (Arno Cost and Norman Doray aka Le Monde Remix) - Pool E Music
- Connected – A feeling World (Arno Cost Remix) - Apollo
- Nicole Otero – Sunshine Song (Arno Cost Remix) - Cr2 Records
- Antoine Clamaran featuring Lulu Hughes – Give Some Love (Arno Cost and Norman Doray aka Le Monde Remix) - Pool E Music
- David Vendetta featuring Rachael Starr – Bleeding Heart (Arno Cost Remix) - Dj Center

2008:

- David Guetta featuring Tara McDonald – Delirious (Arno Cost and Norman Doray Remix) - Virgin
- Tom De Neef and Laidback Luke – Humanoidz (Norman Doray and Arno Cost Remix) - MixMash Records
- Dirty South – The End (Arno Cost Remix) - Vicious
- The Cube Guys – Baba O'Riley (Norman Doray and Arno Cost Remix) - Ministry/Data
- Zoo Brazil – Kalle (Norman Doray and Arno Cost Remix) - Joia

2009:

- Dirty Laundry – Hate Me (Arno Cost Remix) - EQ
- Michael Feiner – Saturday Night (Arno Cost Remix) - Serial Records
- David Guetta featuring Kelly Rowland – When Love Takes Over (Norman Doray and Arno Cost Remix) - Virgin
- TV Rock featuring Rudy and Axwell vs. Modjo – Lady In The Air (Arno Cost and Norman Doray Bootleg)
- Eric Prydz and Steve Angello – Woz Not Noz (Norman Doray and Arno Cost Tribute Remix) - CR2 Records
- Cicada – One Beat Away (Arno Cost Remix) - Critical Mass
- Clearcut featuring Trix – Fireworks (Arno Cost Remix) - Typecast Records

2010:

- Goldfrapp – Alive (Arno Cost Remix) - Mute Records
- Jared Dietch and Mitch Lj featuring Polina – Limit Is The Sky (Arno Cost Remix) - Camel Rider Music

2011:

- Martin Solveig – Ready 2 Go (Arno Cost Remix) - Kontor
- Moby – Lie Down In Darkness (Arno Cost Remix) - Little Idiot
- Daft Punk Vs. Stardust – One More Sounds (Arno Cost Rework)
- David Guetta featuring Sia – Titanium (Arno Cost Remix) - Virgin

2013:

- Burns – Limitless (Arno Cost Remix) - Sony Music

2014:

- Nicky Romero and Anouk - Feet On The Ground (Arno Cost Remix) - Protocol Recordings

2015:

- Denny Berland and Alicia Madison – I Surrender (Arno Cost Remix) - MODA Top

2019:

- Norman Doray - Morning Light (Arno Cost Recut) - Spinnin' Records

2020:

- Phil Fuldner - Fever Clip (Arno Cost and Norman Doray Remix)

2021

- Arty - One Night Away (Arno Cost and Norman Doray Remix)
