= Vazgen Sargsyan Republican Stadium =

Multipurpose stadium in Armenia

Vazgen Sargsyan Republican Stadium Վազգեն Սարգսյանի անվան Հանրապետական մարզադաշտ
- Republican Stadium
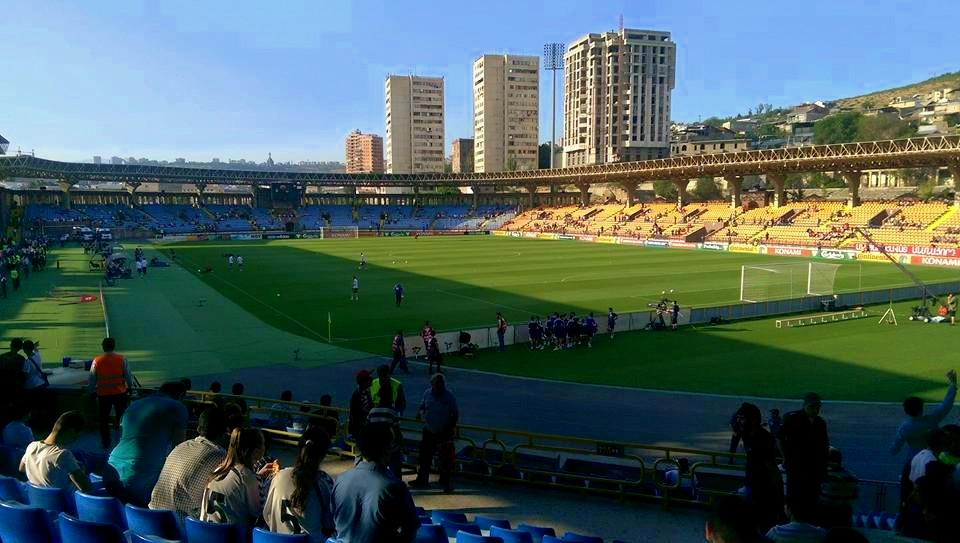
- Vazgen Sargsyan Republican Stadium UEFA
- Interactive map of Vazgen Sargsyan Republican Stadium; Վազգեն Սարգսյանի անվան Հանրապետական մարզադաշտ
- Former names: Dinamo (1935–1999); Republican (1999)
- Location: Yerevan, Armenia
- Coordinates: 40°10′19″N 44°31′33″E
- Owner: Football Federation of Armenia
- Operator: "Vazgen Sargsyan Republican Stadium" CJSC
- Capacity: 14,403
- Executive suites: 107
- Surface: Grass
- Record attendance: 16,000 (October 11, 2003; EURO 2004 Qual.: Armenia – Spain)
- Field size: 105 × 68 meters

Construction
- Built: 1933–1935
- Opened: 1935
- Renovated: 1953, 1999, 2008
- Architect: Koryun Hakobyan

Tenants
- FC Ararat Yerevan (1935–1970, 2015–present); Armenia national football team (1999–present); FC Pyunik (2001–2013, 2017, 2018–present)

Vazgen Sargsyan Republican Stadium (Armenian: Վազգեն Սարգսյանի անվան Հանրապետական մարզադաշտ, romanized: Vazgen Sargsyani anvan Hanrapetakan marzadasht), also known as the Republican Stadium (Armenian: Հանրապետական մարզադաշտ, romanized: Hanrapetakan Marzadasht), is an all-seater multi-use stadium located on 65 Vardanants Street, in the Armenian capital Yerevan. The stadium was built between 1933 and 1935. It was officially opened in 1935 as Dinamo Stadium. Further developments were implemented in 1953, after the end of World War II. It is mainly used for association football and is the home ground of the Armenia national football team. The capacity of the stadium is 14,403 seats.

== History ==
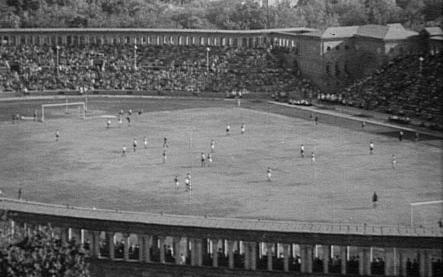
The old Dinamo stadium

The stadium was opened in 1935 during the Soviet days as Dinamo Stadium. In 1999, after a major renovation, the name was changed to Republican Stadium (Hanrapetakan Stadium). By the end of 1999, after the assassination of the former prime minister of Armenia Vazgen Sargsyan, the name of the stadium was officially changed to Vazgen Sargsyan Republican Stadium. It is currently used for football matches and is the home ground of the Armenia national football team as well as the local teams Ararat Armenia and Pyunik who both play in the Armenian Premier League.

A major renovation of the stadium was envisaged to take place in 1995, but the process was delayed due to financial difficulties. In 1999, a large-scale renovation process was launched and more than US$3 million were spent on the development of the infrastructure, the seats and many other facilities, with the financial assistance of the UEFA Executive Committee. By the end of 2000, the stadium was completely renovated with fully covered seating facilities.

The Republican Stadium was named after Vazgen Sargsyan by a presidential decree on December 28, 1999. Vazgen Sargsyan was the commander of the Armenian forces during the First Nagorno-Karabakh War and served as Defence Minister from 1995 to 1999 and Prime Minister from June to October 27, 1999, when he and other high-ranked officials were killed in the Armenian parliament shooting.

Another major renovation was carried on in 2008 through the Israeli company Green Diversified Ltd. The playing pitch was entirely replaced with a modern surface, the VIP sections were repaired and a modern security system was installed in the stadium to meet the UEFA standards. By the end of August 2008, the stadium was ready to host matches on the new pitch. As a result of the installment of new VIP sections, the seating capacity was reduced from 14,917 to 14,403.

== Academy ==
At the northern side of the stadium, the Khoren Hovhannisyan Football Academy operates since 2023. Opened on July 11, 2023, the academy is home to a full size artificial pitch designated for the training of around 300 children on a daily basis. It is named after the former Soviet footballer Khoren Hovhannisyan.

== Concerts ==
In August 2025, American singer Jennifer Lopez performed at the Vazgen Sargsyan Republican Stadium as part of her Up All Night tour. The concert drew over 30,000 spectators, with approximately 15,000 fans traveling to Armenia from various countries to attend the event.

== Attendance records ==
| Date | Team No. 1 | Result | Team No. 2 | Attendance | Competition |
|---|---|---|---|---|---|
| 11 October 2003 | Armenia | 0–4 | Spain | 16,000 | Euro 2004 qualifying Group 6 |
| 22 August 2007 | Armenia | 1–1 | Portugal | 15,550 | Euro 2008 qualifying Group A |
| 13 June 2015 | Armenia | 2–3 | Portugal | 14,527 | Euro 2016 qualifying Group I |
| 7 October 2011 | Armenia | 4–1 | Macedonia | 14,403 | Euro 2012 qualifying Group B |
| 12 October 2012 | Armenia | 0–3 | Czech Republic | 14,403 | 2014 World Cup qualification Group B |
| 26 March 2011 | Armenia | 0–0 | Russia | 14,400 | Euro 2012 qualifying Group B |

== Gallery ==
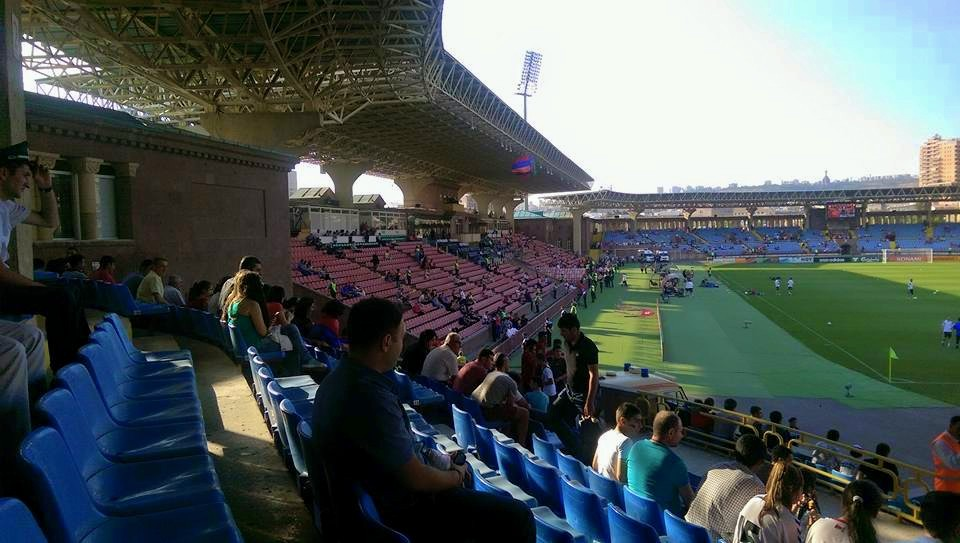
The western stand (red seats)

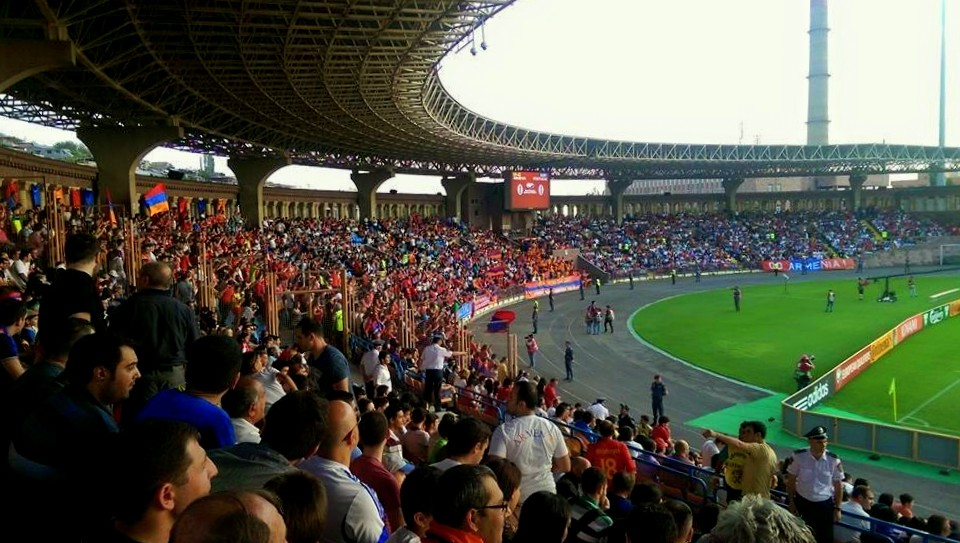
The southern stand

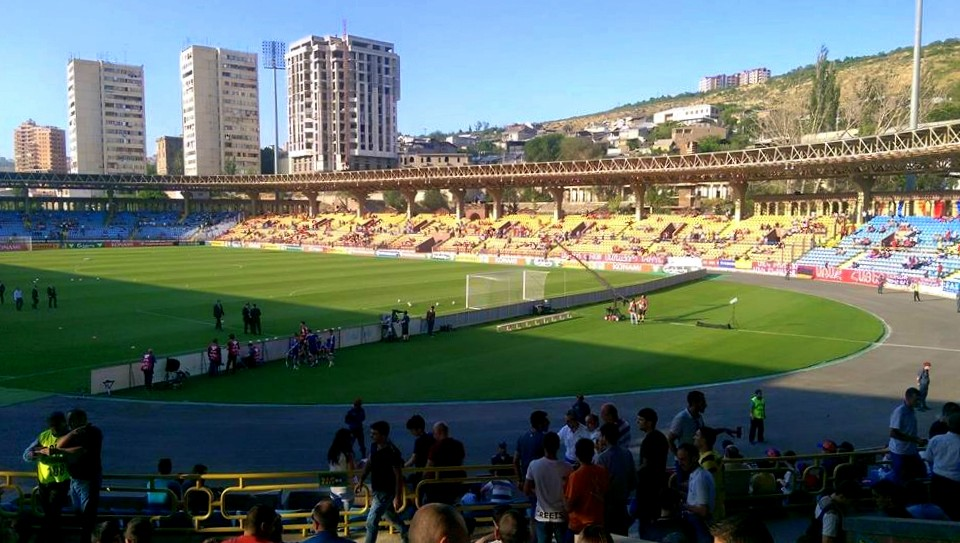
The eastern stand (orange seats)

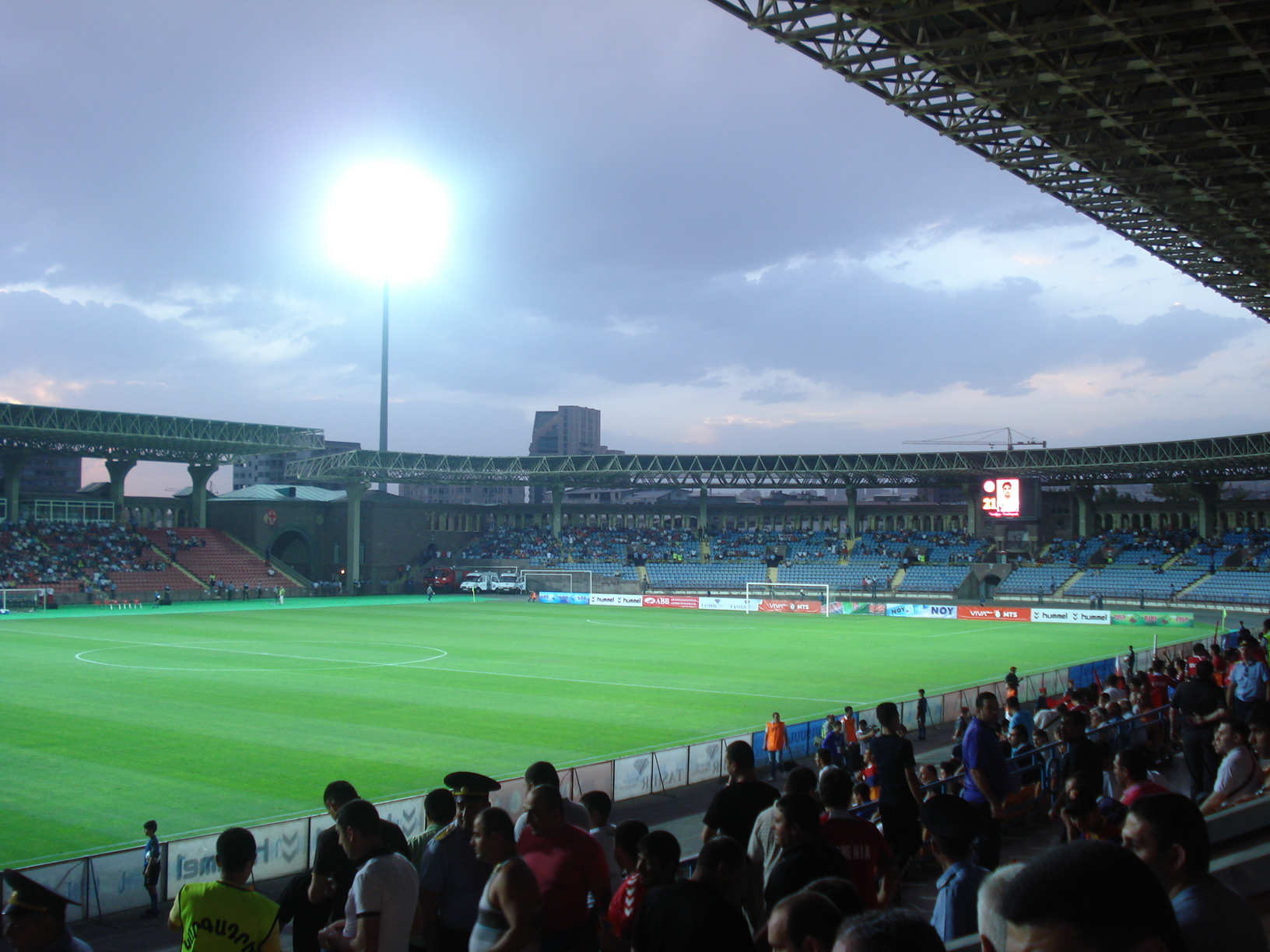
The northern stand (blue seats)
