= Birthday (Jennifer Lopez song) =

2025 single by Jennifer Lopez

Single by Jennifer Lopez
- Released: July 24, 2025
- Recorded: 2025
- Length: 2:27
- Label: Nuyorican; Hundred Days
- Songwriters: Jennifer Lopez; Alexis "8AE" Boyd; Anjelica "Jelli Do" Dorman; Kuk Harrell; Lit; Rob Bisel
- Producer: Rob Bisel

Jennifer Lopez singles chronology
"Rebound" (2024)	"Birthday" (2025)	"Save Me Tonight" (2026)

"Birthday" is a song by American singer Jennifer Lopez. It was released on July 24, 2025, Lopez's 56th birthday, by Nuyorican Productions and Hundred Days Records. It was written by Lopez, Alexis "8AE" Boyd, Anjelica "Jelli Do" Dorman, Kuk Harrell, PLit, and Rob Bisel, the latter of whom produced it. A bass-heavy club anthem, "Birthday" has lyrics that talk of Lopez celebrating her day of birth. It was accompanied by a visualizer video and was performed live during many of Lopez's tour stops on her Up All Night: Live in 2025 tour.

== Background and release ==
"Birthday" is a "bass-heavy club anthem", featuring lyrics centred celebrations of one's day of birth. It debuted on July 21, when it was added to the Lucca, Italy stop of the Up All Night: Live in 2025. "Birthday" is the first solo song released by Lopez in 2025, and second overall song that year following British DJ Joel Corry's reimagining of Lopez's 2005 single "Get Right". On July 24, Lopez's 56th birthday, Lopez released the song "Birthday". At the time, Lopez was performing in Turkey as part her Up All Night: Live in 2025 tour, and celebrated her birthday by recreating some of the songs lyrics. Such lyrics include, "Name on top of the cake, it's my birthday/I'ma make this famous ass shake, it’s my birthday". During the performance, Lopez danced in a "silver backless dress" in front of a life size three-tiered cake; dancers and musicians from the tour appeared on stage as part of the performance. A follow-up video was posted on Instagram, featuring Lopez dancing to the song.

== Music video ==
An official visualizer was released on the same day as the single. The video shows scenes from Lopez's performance of the song during her Up All Night: Live in 2025 tour. Additionally, Lopez dances in a "silver-sequined bodysuit with matching boots".

== Track listing ==
Digital Single

1. "Birthday" - 2:27

Digital EP

1. "Birthday" (Sped Up) - 1:59
2. "Birthday" (Slowed) - 3:09
3. "Birthday" - 2:27
4. "Birthday" (Instrumental) - 2:27
5. "Birthday" (Acapella) - 2:26

== Release history ==
"Birthday" release dates and formats
Region	Date	Format	Version(s)	Label	Ref.
Various	July 24, 2025	Download; streaming	Digital Single	Nuyorican Productions; Hundred Days Records	
Various	August 15, 2025	Download; streaming	Digital Extended play (EP)	Nuyorican Productions; Hundred Days Records	
