= Marc Benjamin =

Dutch DJ and music producer

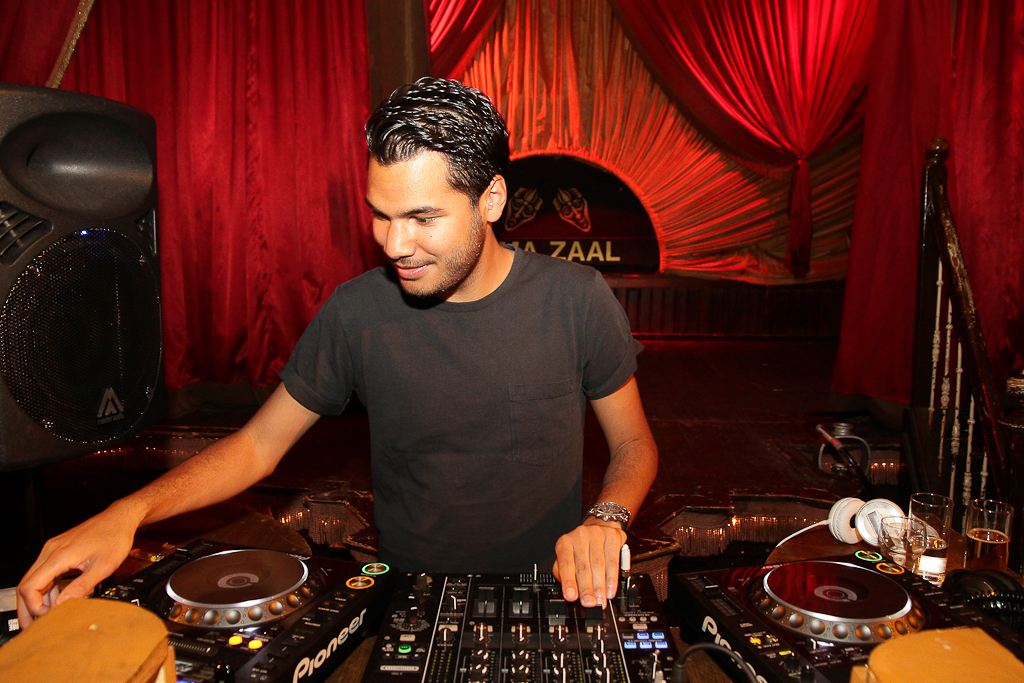
- Marc Benjamin in 2013

Background information
- Born: Marc Benjamin Latupapua; 16 January 1990 (age 36); Heemstede, Netherlands
- Origin: Netherlands
- Genres: Electro house, progressive house, electronic dance music
- Occupations: DJ, record producer
- Instrument: Ableton Live
- Years active: 2007-present
- Labels: Spinnin' Records, Mixmash Records, Ultra Records, Axtone Records, Universal Music Group, BMG, Protocol Recordings
- Website: marc-benjamin.com

Marc Benjamin Latupapua (born 16 January 1990) is a Dutch DJ and music producer. He is known for his remix work and collaborations with Afrojack, Zedd, Fedde Le Grand, Benny Benassi, Laidback Luke and his releases on Spinnin' Records, Mixmash Records, Ultra Records, Universal Music Group, and Axtone Records. In 2020 he ranked at number 27 as new entry in the top 101 producer list of 1001tracklist. In 2014, he performed at Ministry of Sound London and made his Tomorrowland debut on the second mainstage. Tomorrowland Belgium is marked as one of the biggest electronic music festivals in the world.

== Musical career ==
Coming from a musical family, with his sister also being a DJ, he has been working with music since a child. The Dutch DJ achieved his first residency at the age of 16, where he gained experience in the European club scene. At the age of 17, he was performing internationally, across Europe and soon later around the world. His first big release occurred on 30 December 2013 when his single "Riser" on Afrojack’s Wall Recordings achieved a top ten slot in Beatport’s top 100 chart. This track gained him international exposure. Afterwards he collaborated with Laidback Luke, which led to the release of "We're Forever" and "Tell Me That You Love Me".

In July 2015, he collaborated with Benny Benassi on "Who I Am" featuring Christian Burns, which was released on Ultra Music. Between 2011 and 2016 he was the resident DJ for Thursday nights in Amsterdam’s nightclub Escape. He also was requested six times to remix work of the Grammy Award-winning producer, Zedd, which led to remixes of “Find You”, “I Want You To Know with Selena Gomez”, “The Middle”, “Happy Now”, “Good Thing” and “Funny”. Later, he joined Zedd's True Colors Tour & Orbit Tour.

In 2017, he teamed up with Yves V and released their single "Blow" on Spinnin' Records. Following this, Marc released his single "Thunder" on Steve Angello’s label Size Records. In September 2017, Marc played the closing slot as headliner on the Ultra Music Festival in Bali, Indonesia. In 2019 he released a cover of Blue (Da Ba Dee) from Eiffel65 named "All The Time".

In 2020 he released his collaboration with Fedde Le Grand named "To The Top". and released his single “Losing Focus” on Axwell's label Axtone Records (November 6, 2020). In 2021, he released "Dancing Alone" on Universal Music Group. Following this, he released his collaboration with Afrojack named "Start Over Again".

== Discography ==
=== Releases ===
- 2024: Marc Benjamin, Absun & WolfCaveland - Out Of Time (Platonik Recordings)
- 2024: Marc Benjamin & Rio - Nothing To Prove(Platonik Recordings)
- 2024: Marc Benjamin, Ansun & Keyton - Sleep Better (Future House Music)
- 2024: Marc Benjamin - Better Now (Hexagon)
- 2024: Marc Benjamin & Nevrmind - Just the Two of Us (BCMP Remix) (Platonik Recordings)
- 2024: Marc Benjamin - Same Old Love (Future Disco Mix) (Platonik Recordings)
- 2024: Marc Benjamin - Same Old Love (Platonik Recordings)
- 2024: Marc Benjamin & Ruggi - Game Over (Platonik Recordings)
- 2024: Marc Benjamin - Rise Up (Platonik Recordings)
- 2024: Marc Benjamin & YAKSA - Freedom (Platonik Recordings)
- 2024: Marc Benjamin - All The Way (Platonik Recordings)
- 2024: Marc Benjamin - Bing Bing (Platonik Recordings)
- 2024: Marc Benjamin, 1stVirginia feat. SRNO - Manifesting (1ST)
- 2024: Marc Benjamin & Ruggi - Stay With Me EP (Platonik Recordings)
- 2024: Marc Benjamin & Rory Hope - One In A Million (Future House Music)
- 2024: Marc Benjamin & Palane - Pieces Of You EP (Platonik Recordings)
- 2023: Marc Benjamin & Bad Amie - Fitness (Platonik Recordings)
- 2023: Marc Benjamin, SouMix & Murphy - Survivor (Found Red Records / Platonik Recordings)
- 2023: Marc Benjamin feat. Aries - Body Move (One Seven Music)
- 2023: Marc Benjamin - You And I (One Seven Music)
- 2023: Marc Benjamin & David Allen - Lifetime (Panthers Groove)
- 2023: Marc Benjamin feat. Sonam - Out Of My Mind (Platonik Recordings)
- 2023: Marc Benjamin & Ansun - Thunderstorm (Hexagon)
- 2023: Marc Benjamin - My Focus Is You (Platonik Recordings)
- 2023: Marc Benjamin, Jordan Grace & Renaissance - Into The Wind (ZERO COOL)
- 2023: Marc Benjamin, Ansun, CLOSED feat. Sonam - Part Of Me (Future House Music)
- 2023: Marc Benjamin & Roosterjaxx - Do It For Daddy (Hysteria Records)
- 2023: Marc Benjamin feat. Simon Erics - Whistle (Amsterdam RemiXXX) (Turn It Up Muzik)
- 2023: Marc Benjamin, Zakfreestyler, Roosterjaxx feat. El Kourd - Fi Dlam Lil (Platonik Recordings)
- 2023: Marc Benjamin, Billy The Kit & Nevrmind - Found Love (Hexagon)
- 2023: Marc Benjamin - When It All Comes Together (Chris Late Remix) (Future House Music)
- 2023: Marc Benjamin - Believe (Hexagon)
- 2023: Marc Benjamin & Carl Orff - O Fortuna (Decca Records France)
- 2023: Marc Benjamin, Simon Erics - When It All Comes Together (Future House Music)
- 2023: Marc Benjamin, Nevrmind - Just The Two Of Us (Platonik Recordings)
- 2023: Marc Benjamin - One More Time (One Seven Music)
- 2023: Marc Benjamin - Touch Me (Platonik Recordings)
- 2023: Marc Benjamin - Cold (Platonik Recordings)
- 2023: Marc Benjamin - So Good (Platonik Recordings)
- 2023: Marc Benjamin & Chemical Neon - In My Arms (One Seven Music)
- 2022: Marc Benjamin & Gyan Chappory - Solo (Future House Music)
- 2022: Marc Benjamin - Crypto (Heartfeldt)
- 2022: Marc Benjamin - Dance All Night (One Seven Music)
- 2022: Marc Benjamin - Anything (Club Mix) (Future House Music)
- 2022: Marc Benjamin - Demons (Platonik Recordings)
- 2022: Marc Benjamin - The Way (Platonik Recordings)
- 2022: Marc Benjamin - I Want More (VIP Mix) (Future House Music)
- 2022: Marc Benjamin - Nintendo (Marc Benjamin)
- 2022: Marc Benjamin, Chemical Neon, Polina Vita - Paradise (One Seven Music)
- 2022: Marc Benjamin - Hold You (Marc Benjamin)
- 2022: Marc Benjamin - Anything (Future House Music)
- 2022: Marc Benjamin - Light A Fire (Marc Benjamin)
- 2022: Marc Benjamin x ZANA - Edge Of Paradise (Protocol Recordings)
- 2022: Marc Benjamin feat Eric Simons - Whistle (TurnItUp Muzik)
- 2022: Marc Benjamin & Galwaro feat. Julia Viktoria - Hard To Forget (One Seven Music)
- 2022: Marc Benjamin - When The Sounds Disappear (Universal Music Group)
- 2022: Marc Benjamin, Jay Mason - Human Heart (Future House Music)
- 2021: Marc Benjamin feat. Nevrmind - Waiting For You (Future Disco Mix) (Universal Music Group)
- 2021: Marc Benjamin - Turn Back Time (Protocol Recordings)
- 2021: Marc Benjamin featuring Nevrmind - Waiting For You (Universal Music Group)
- 2021: Marc Benjamin, Ocean Roses - Summertime (Heartfeldt)
- 2021: Marc Benjamin and Billy The Kit - Make Me Feel (Future House Music)
- 2021: Marc Benjamin, Timmo Hendriks and VY•DA featuring Alessia Labate - Hold Me Down (Protocol Recordings)
- 2021: Marc Benjamin featuring Daecolm - With Me (Future House Music / Chill Your Mind)
- 2021: Marc Benjamin featuring Lena Leon - Lonely One (One Seven Music)
- 2021: Marc Benjamin featuring Nodis - Feel Something (Source / Spinnin' Records)
- 2021: Marc Benjamin and Chemical Neon featuring Sophia Gripari - Hit Me Up Again (Heartfeldt)
- 2021: Marc Benjamin and Moonway featuring Chanel - Lovin' You (Future House Music)
- 2021: Marc Benjamin and Bancali - Miss You (Spinnin' Records)
- 2021: Marc Benjamin and Chris Willis - Not Afraid (One Seven Music)
- 2021: Marc Benjamin - I Want More (Future House Music / Chill Your Mind)
- 2021: Marc Benjamin and Afrojack featuring Vula - Start Over Again (Wall Recordings)
- 2021: Marc Benjamin - Dancing Alone (Universal Music Group)
- 2020: Marc Benjamin and Tishmal - Blinded By Your Light (Protocol Recordings)
- 2020: Marc Benjamin, Marcus Santoro and David Pietras - Losing Focus (Axtone Records)
- 2020: Marc Benjamin and Ansun - Too Much (Future House Music)
- 2020: Marc Benjamin and Noto - No Feelings (Revealed Recordings)
- 2020: Marc Benjamin featuring Renae - Take Me Up (Heartfeldt Records)
- 2020: Marc Benjamin featuring Hype and Fever - Bump It (Future House Music)
- 2020: Marc Benjamin and Victor Tellagio - Burn (Protocol Recordings)
- 2020: Marc Benjamin - Genie In a Bottle (Hexagon Records)
- 2020: Marc Benjamin - Turn Up (Maxximize Records)
- 2020: Marc Benjamin featuring Able Faces - Show You Love (Heartfeldt Records)
- 2020: Marc Benjamin and Timmo Hendriks - Be Alright (Protocol Recordings)
- 2020: Marc Benjamin and Dnmkg featuring Able Faces - Horizons (Heldeep Records)
- 2020: Fedde Le Grand and Marc Benjamin - To The Top (Darklight Recordings)
- 2020: Marc Benjamin and Malarkey - I Got 5 On It (Future House Music)
- 2020: Marc Benjamin - Wild Bill (Heldeep Records)
- 2019: Marc Benjamin - All the Time (Spinnin' Records)
- 2019: Marc Benjamin and RayRay - My Swag (Protocol Recordings)
- 2019: Marc Benjamin and RayRay - Pop N Rewind (Spinnin' Records)
- 2019: Marc Benjamin and JPB featuring Jorik Burema - Dead Ends (Tribal Trap)
- 2019: Marc Benjamin - Off Road (Skink)
- 2019: Marc Benjamin - Show You (Protocol Recordings)
- 2019: Marc Benjamin and Dnmkg featuring F51 - Hooked (Protocol Recordings)
- 2019: Marc Benjamin - Fall For You (Protocol Recordings)
- 2019: Marc Benjamin - Out Of Touch (Tipsy Records)
- 2018: Marc Benjamin - Blaster (Protocol Recordings)
- 2018: Marc Benjamin and N3on - Unbreakable Hearts featuring Shanee (Protocol Recordings)
- 2018: Marc Benjamin and Jpb - Devil In Disguise featuring Syon and Yung Fusion (Protocol Recordings)
- 2018: Marc Benjamin and Eric Lumiere - One Chance (Playground Music Scandinavia)
- 2017: Marc Benjamin and Regilio - Thunder (Size Records)
- 2017: Yves V and Marc Benjamin - Blow (Spinnin' Records)
- 2016: Marc Benjamin and Dnmkg featuring Jaicko Lawrence - Reflection (This Time) (Powerhouse Music)
- 2015: Laidback Luke and Marc Benjamin - Tell Me That You Love Me (Mixmash Records)
- 2015: Benny Benassi and Marc Benjamin featuring Christian Burns - Who I Am (Ultra Records)
- 2015: Marc Benjamin - Galactic (Revealed Recordings)
- 2015: Marc Benjamin and Revero - Lights Camera Action (Revealed Recordings)
- 2014: Marc Benjamin - The Center (Revealed Recordings)
- 2014: Marc Benjamin - City Lights (Mixmash Records)
- 2014: Marc Benjamin - Phantom (Mixmash Records)
- 2014: Laidback Luke and Marc Benjamin - We're Forever (Mixmash Records)
- 2014: Marc Benjamin - Rocket Science (Ultra Records)
- 2013: Marc Benjamin - Riser (Wall Recordings)
- 2013: Marc Benjamin - Break It Down (OTW Mixmash Records)
- 2013: Marc Benjamin - The Crash (OTW Mixmash Records)
- 2013: Marc Benjamin - Soldier (OTW Mixmash Records)
- 2013: Marc Benjamin - Last Night (Dim Mak Records)
- 2013: Marc Benjamin - Surrender (Mixmash Records)
- 2013: Marc Benjamin - Superstuff (Mixmash Records)
- 2012: Marc Benjamin - Games (Dim Mak Records)
- 2011: Marc Benjamin - Just Relax (Bedroom Muzik)
- 2011: Marc Benjamin - Loose Cannon (Caballero Recordings)
- 2011: Marc Benjamin - Tuesday (Caballero Recordings)
- 2011: Marc Benjamin and Remaniax - Dancing in the dark (Vendetta Records)
- 2011: Marc Benjamin - So Damn Baby (Soulman Music)
- 2010: Marc Benjamin - Members Only (Bedroom Muzik)
- 2010: Marc Benjamin - Roadtrip (Mixmash Records)
- 2010: Marc Benjamin, Remaniax and Skitzofrenix - Activate My Love (Spinnin Records)
- 2010: Marc Benjamin, Remaniax and Skitzofrenix - Is That You (Spinnin Records)
- 2010: Marc Benjamin - Trick (Sneakerz Muzik)
- 2010: Marc Benjamin - Nimsay (Sneakerz Muzik)
- 2009: Marc Benjamin - Trick (Sneakerz Muzik)
- 2009: Marc Benjamin - Nimsay (Sneakerz Muzik)
- 2009: Marc Benjamin - On the Boxes (Sneakerz Muzik)
- 2009: Marc Benjamin and Remaniax - Blazin (Audiodamage Records)

=== Remixes ===
- 2021: Marc Benjamin, Timmo Hendriks and VY•DA featuring Alessia Labate - Hold Me Down (Vip Mix) (Protocol Recordings)
- 2021: Ewave - No More (Marc Benjamin Edit) (Heartfeldt)
- 2021: Mimoza - Young Queen (Marc Benjamin Remix) (Polydor Records) (Island Records) (Universal Music Group)
- 2021: Arrested Youth - Leave My Casket Open (Marc Benjamin Remix) (Lowly)
- 2020: Afsheen - Dancing With You (Marc Benjamin and Tom Westy Remix) (Heldeep Records)
- 2020: Zedd and Jasmine Thompson - Funny (Marc Benjamin Remix) (Atlantic Records)
- 2020: Zerb and Noto - Like 2 Party (Marc Benjamin Edit) (Generation Hex)
- 2020: Afrojack featuring Ally Brooke - All Night (Marc Benjamin Remix) (Spinnin' Records / Wall Recordings)
- 2020: Zedd and Kehlani - Good Thing (Marc Benjamin Remix) (Interscope / Universal Music)
- 2019: AY AY - what you need featuring QNTN (Marc Benjamin Remix) (BMG Rights Management)
- 2019: The Chainsmokers - Who Do You Love (Marc Benjamin Remix) (Disruptor Records / Sony Music)
- 2018: Weslee - Sweat Dreams (Marc Benjamin & DNMKG Remix)
- 2018: Zedd and Elley Duhé - Happy Now (Marc Benjamin Remix) (Interscope / Universal Music)
- 2018: Zedd, Maren Morris and Grey - The Middle (Marc Benjamin Remix) (Interscope / Universal Music)
- 2017: Francesco Gabbani - Occidentali's Karma (Marc Benjamin and Dnmkg Remix) (BMG Rights Management)
- 2015: Zedd and Selena Gomez - I Want You to Know (Marc Benjamin Remix) (Interscope / Universal Music)
- 2014: Laidback Luke and Marc Benjamin - We're Forever (Marc Benjamin Remix) (Mixmash Records)
- 2014: John Christian - Next Level (Marc Benjamin Remix) (Protocol Recordings)
- 2014: Zedd featuring Matthew Koma and Miriam Bryant - Find You (Marc Benjamin Remix) (Interscope / Universal Music)
- 2014: Laidback Luke - Collide (Marc Benjamin Remix) (Mixmash Records)
- 2013: Clinton VanSciver - Indie Anna Jones (Marc Benjamin Remix) (Dim Mak Records)
- 2013: Tom Staar - Kingdom (Marc Benjamin Remix) (Mixmash Records)

=== Compilations ===
- 2011: Nope Is Dope Vol.10 (Mixed by Marc Benjamin) (Rodeo Media)
