= Norman Doray =

- Also known as: The Frenchmakers, The Freshmakers, Le Monde
- Born: Jérémy Lecarour; August 15, 1983 (age 43); Auray, Brittany, France
- Origin: Auray, Brittany, France
- Genres: House; French house
- Occupations: DJ; record producer
- Years active: 2005–present
- Labels: Positiva Records; Strictly Rhythm; Size Records
- Website: www.normandoray.com

Jérémy Lecarour (French pronunciation: [ʒeʁemi ləkaʁuʁ]; born August 15, 1983, in Auray, Brittany), better known by his stage name Norman Doray (French: [nɔʁman dɔʁɛ]), is a French musician, DJ and music producer.

== Discography ==
=== Charting singles ===
Year	Title	Peak chart positions												Album
Year	Title	AUS	AUT	BEL (Vl)	BEL (Wa)	FIN	FRA	GER	IRL	NLD	SWE	SWI	UK	Album
2009	"Last Forever" (with Tristan Garner featuring Errol Reid)	—	—	7^{[A]}	—	—	—	—	—	—	—	—	—	—
2012	"Trilogy" (with Arno Cost and Laidback Luke)	—	—	7^{[B]}	—	—	—	—	—	—	—	—	—	—
"—" denotes a recording that did not chart or was not released in that territory.

=== Singles ===
- 2006: "Let U Go" (as The Freshmakers) (Serial Records)
- 2006: "In The Name of Love"
- 2006: "Dance All Night EP" (with Pierre de la Touche) (Disco Galaxy)
- 2007: "Jetlag" (Serial Records)
- 2007: "Apocalypse" (with Arno Cost) (CR2 Records)
- 2008: "Miracle" (as The Frenchmakers) (Serial Records)
- 2008: "Krystal" (CR2 Records)
- 2009: "Last Forever" (with Tristan Garner and Errol Reid) (CR2 Records)
- 2009: "Drink N Dial" (with Albin Myers) (Joia Records/Serial Records)
- 2009: "Tobita" (CR2 Records)
- 2010: "Chase the Sun" (with David Tort) (Nero Records)
- 2010: "Tweet it" (with Tim Berg and Sebastien Drums) (Size Records)
- 2010: "Paradisco" (Arno Cost, Norman Doray and Ben Macklin)
- 2011: "Champagne" (with Richard Grey)
- 2011: "Kalifornia" (Strictly Rhythm)
- 2011: "Breakaway" featuring Tawiah (Warner Music)
- 2012: "Trilogy" (with Laidback Luke and Arno Cost) (Mixmash Records)
- 2012: "Leo" (Spinnin Records)
- 2012: "Cracks" featuring Andreas Moe (Spinnin Records)
- 2012: "Music" (with Mitomi Tokoto) (Azuli Records)
- 2012: "Celsius" (with Eddie Thoneick) (Size Records)
- 2012: "Something To Believe In" (with Nervo and Cookie) (Spinnin Records)
- 2013: "Filtre" (LE7ELS)
- 2013: "TroubleMaker" (Size Records)
- 2014: "Darkest Days (Apocalypse 2014)" (with Arno Cost and Dev) (Spinnin' Records)
- 2014: "Strong" (with Arno Cost) (Size Records)
- 2015: "Rising Love" (with Arno Cost and Mike Taylor) (Polydor)
- 2015: "Bring Back The Groove" (with Bottai) (Armada)
- 2015: "Street Sounds"(Spinnin' Records)
- 2016: "Falling For You" (Spinnin' Records)
- 2016: "All In" (Armada Music)
- 2016: "For Real" (Spinnin' Records)
- 2017: "Somethin' About" (Flamingo Records)
- 2018: "Enough"
- 2019: "Together" (With Arno Cost) (Positiva Records)
- 2019: "Travolta" (with Arno Cost) [Stmpd Rcrds]
- 2019: "Do What" (Hotfingers Records)
- 2019: "Wanna Do" (with Arno Cost) (Club Sweat)
- 2020: "Take Some Time" (with Santeli and Bigstate) (Spinnin' Deep)
- 2020: "Darlin'" (with Arno Cost) (A Positiva / Virgin EMI Records)
- 2020: "Tell The World" (featuring Sneaky Sound System) (CR2 Records)
- 2020: "One Night" (with Arno Cost) [Stmpd Rcrds]
- 2020: "Give It Up" (with Piem) (Spinnin' Deep)
- 2020: "Dat's Right" (Sushi Muzik)
- 2021: "Show Luv" (with Arno Cost) (Spinnin' Records)

=== Remixes ===
2006:

- Da Sushiman – In & Out (The Freshmakers Remix) - Ledge Music
- Rilod – Thriller (The Freshmakers Remix) – Nice Music
- Mathieu Bouthier and Muttonheads aka Serial Crew – Make Your Own Kind of Music (The Frenchmakers Remix) - Serial Records

2007:

- Henrik B – Soul Heaven (Norman Doray Remix) - Nero Records
- Sunfreakz – Counting Down the Days (Norman Doray and Arno Cost aka Le Monde Remix) - Pool E Music
- Antoine Clamaran featuring Lulu Hughes – Give Some Love (Arno Cost and Norman Doray aka Le Monde Remix) - Pool E Music

2008:

- David Guetta Feat. Tara McDonald – Delirious (Norman Doray and Arno Cost Remix) - EMI
- Tom De Neef and Laidback Luke – Humanoidz (Norman Doray and Arno Cost Remix) - MixMash Records
- Seamus Haji vs Lords of Flatbush – 24 Hours (Nice Tight Derriere) (Norman Doray Remix) - Big Love
- The Cube Guys – Baba O'Riley (Norman Doray and Arno Cost Remix) - Ministry of Sound Uk
- Zoo Brazil – Kalle (Norman Doray and Arno Cost Remix) - Nero Records

2009:

- Those Usual Suspects – Shadows (Norman Doray Remix) - Ministry of Sound Australia
- David Guetta featuring Kelly Rowland – When Love Takes Over (Norman Doray and Arno Cost Remix) - EMI
- The Face vs Mark Brown and Adam Shaw – Needin U (Norman Doray Eivissa Remix) - CR2 Records
- Eric Prydz and Steve Angello – Woz not Noz (Norman Doray and Arno Cost Tribute Remix) - CR2 Records

2010:

- Toni Braxton – Make My Heart (Norman Doray Remix) - Atlantic Records
- Henrik B Feat. Christian Alvestam – Now and Forever (Norman Doray Cazzo Remix) - Nero Records
- Dirty South featuring Rudy – Phazing (Norman Doray Remix) - Phazing Records

2011:

- Sandy Rivera and Rae – Hide U (Norman Doray Remix) - Defected Records
- David Tort featuring Gosha – One Look (Norman Doray Remix) - Axtone Records
- David Guetta featuring Taio Cruz – Little Bad Girl (Norman Doray Remix) - EMI

2012:

- Kaskade and Skrillex – Lick It (Norman Doray Remix) - Ultra
- Sneaky Sound System – Friends (Norman Doray Remix) - Modular

2013:

- Robin Thicke featuring Kendrick Lamar – Give It 2 U (Norman Doray and Rob Adans Remix) - Star Trak

2014:

- Andrew Bayer – England (Norman Doray Edit) (Norman Doray Edit) - Anjunadeep
- Disclosure featuring Sam Smith – Latch (Norman Doray Remix) - PMR
- La Roux – Uptight Downtown (Norman Doray Remix) - Polydor

2015:

- Cerrone – Love in C Minor (Norman Doray LA Remix) - Malligator
- Demi Lovato – Cool for the Summer (Norman Doray Remix) - Island Records
- Ryn Weaver – Promises (Norman Doray Remix) - Interscope
- Mike Taylor – Body High (Norman Doray Venice Remix) - Free

2016:

- Chromeo – Night by Night (Norman Doray French Remix) - Free

2019:

- Arno Cost - Set Me Free (Norman Doray Recut) - Size Records
- S.A.M - Fury's Laughter (Norman Doray Remix) - Spinnin' Deep

2020:

- Phil Fuldner - Fever Clip (Arno Cost and Norman Doray Remix)

2021

- Arty - One Night Away (Arno Cost and Norman Doray Remix)

2022

- Young Parisians and Katherine Amy - Rediscover (Norman Doray Remix)
