= Cala di Volpe =

Bay and community in Sardinia, Italy

Coordinates: 41.094°N 9.539°E

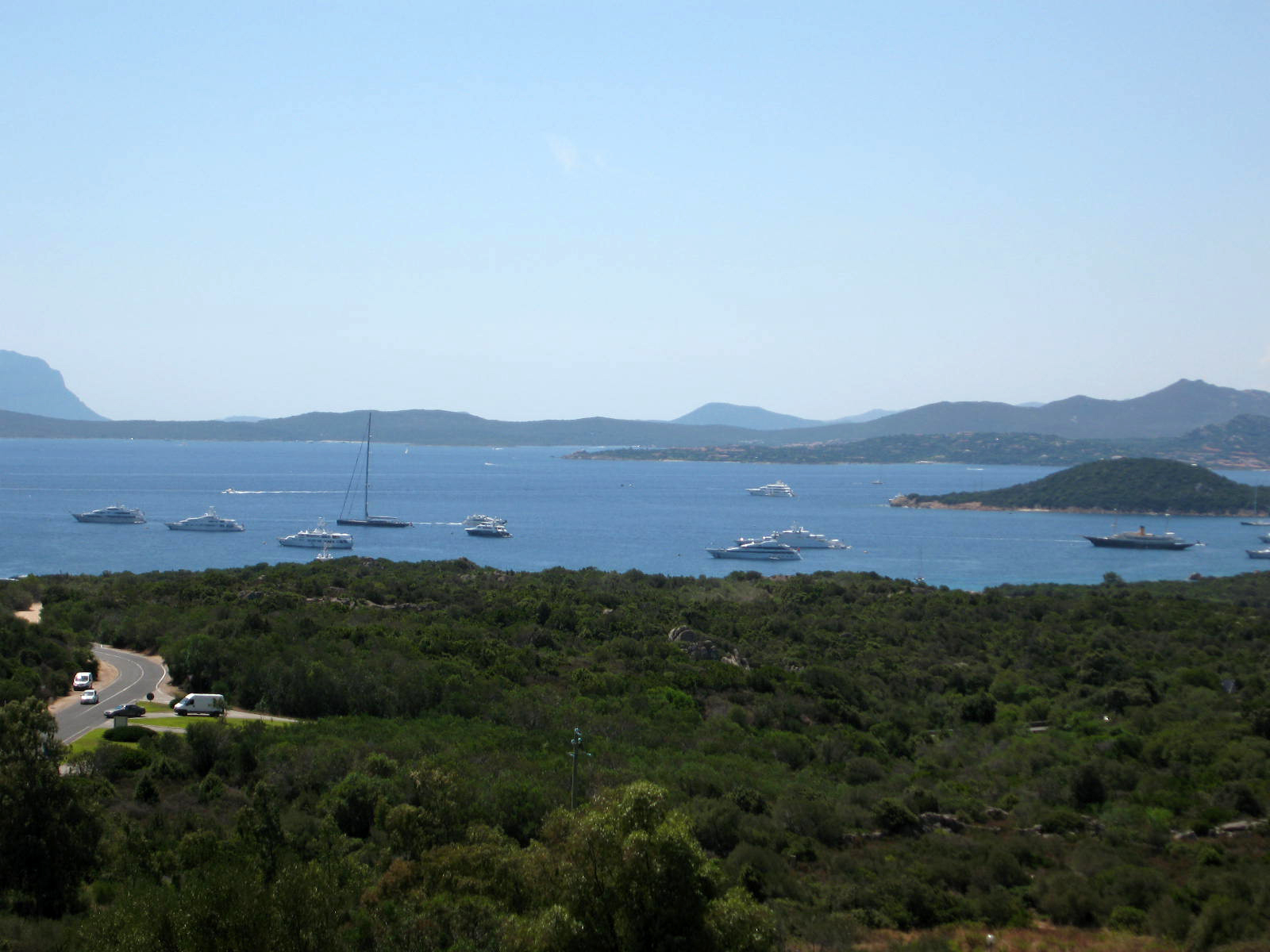
Cala di Volpe

Cala di Volpe is a bay and small community located in Arzachena in the province of Sassari, in north-east Sardinia. It lies in the historical and geographical region known as Gallura on the Costa Smeralda.

Cala di Volpe is located south of Capriccioli. The town has a natural harbour.

The bay is also famous for its namesake luxury hotel designed by Jacques Couelle and the superpanfili arriving in summer that dock on buoys, which are located in the south cove. Cala di Volpe has a small wooden pier. Some scenes from the James Bond film The Spy Who Loved Me were filmed in this resort town.
