= Laidback Luke =

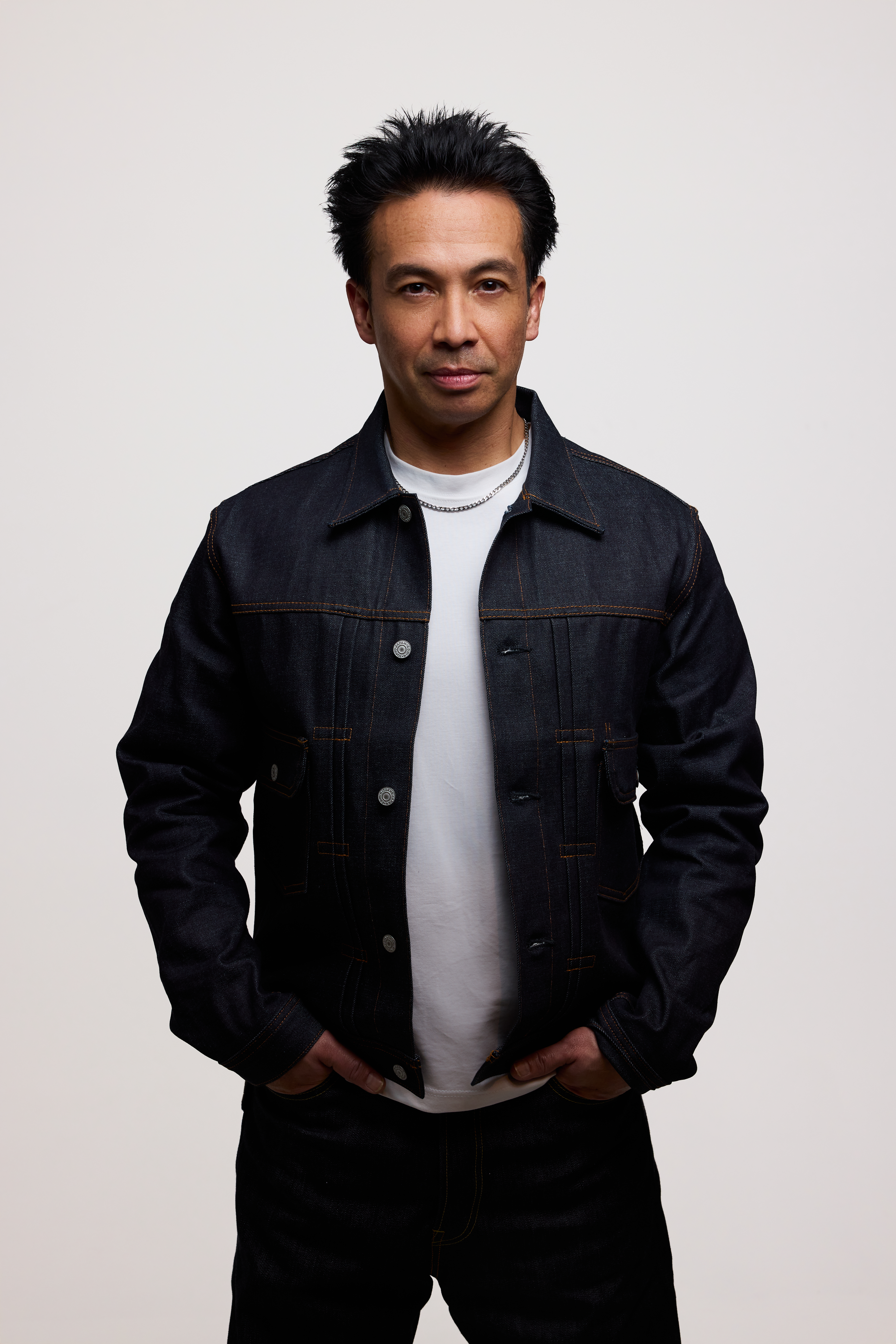
- Luke in 2026

Background information
- Also known as: LBL; Dark Chanell
- Born: Lucas Cornelis van Scheppingen; October 22, 1976 (age 49); Manila, Philippines
- Origin: Hoofddorp, Netherlands
- Genres: Electro house; house; progressive house; Dutch house; techno; Bloghouse; fidget house
- Occupations: Disc jockey; record producer; remixer; martial artist
- Instruments: Keyboards; FL Studio; Ableton Live
- Years active: 1992–present
- Labels: Mixmash; Dim Mak; Spinnin'; Ultra
- Website: laidbackluke.com

Lucas Cornelis van Scheppingen (born 22 October 1976), better known under his stage name Laidback Luke, is a Filipino-born Dutch DJ and record producer. He is the founder of Mixmash Records and is widely credited as a key figure in the rise of electro house and Dutch house music in the late 2000s. He has collaborated with artists including Swedish House Mafia, Steve Aoki, David Guetta, and James Brown, and has remixed recordings by Madonna, Mariah Carey, Nicki Minaj, Daft Punk, and Depeche Mode, among others.

== Early life ==
Lucas van Scheppingen was born to a Dutch father, Kees van Scheppingen, and a Filipina mother, Lucy Baruelo, in Manila, Philippines. The family relocated to the Netherlands during his childhood, and he grew up in Hoofddorp, a town in the North Holland province, together with his younger brother, Asley. He has credited his musical cousins in the Philippines, John Mark, Joseph, and Jed, as early influences on his love of music.

As a teenager, Luke developed parallel interests in graffiti art, martial arts, and electronic music. His introduction to club music came through a school dance, after which he became fascinated with the mechanics of DJing and music production. A friend who owned an Amiga computer introduced him to sampling and music software, sparking his interest in production. He invested in a synthesizer and began crafting his own tracks, drawing early inspiration from Chicago house's hard-charging rhythms and the funky hard techno sound emerging from Europe at the time. He began his music career in 1992 and credits fellow Dutch DJ and producer Gaston Steenkist, known by the alias Dobre, as a formative mentor who provided feedback on his early demos and helped him secure his first record deal at the age of 18.

== Career ==
=== 1990s–2000s: Early career and rise in house music ===
Luke began releasing music under the Laidback Luke name in the mid-1990s, developing a style rooted in Chicago house and hard techno that drew comparisons to the underground club scenes of Detroit and Amsterdam. He released his debut studio album, Psyched Up, in 1998, followed by Electronic Satisfaction in 2002, records that established him as a respected figure in the Dutch underground dance scene. He further cemented his reputation with the mix album Windmill Skill in 2003, which showcased his range as both a DJ and tastemaker. That same year, he contributed a remix of the Daft Punk track "Crescendolls" to the duo's remix album Daft Club, marking one of his earliest high-profile international collaborations. He also released the mix album Ibiza Closing Party as a free covermount CD with the October 2008 issue of Mixmag, reflecting his growing presence on the global DJ circuit.

By the late 2000s, Luke had become a central figure in the emerging Bloghouse and electro house movements, a genre crossover that blended indie sensibilities with hard-edged dancefloor energy. He ranked at number 46 on DJ Mag's Top 100 DJs list in 2008, jumping to number 27 in 2009 and continuing to rise through 2010, reflecting his rapidly expanding international profile. A defining moment came through his collaborations with Steve Angello, Sebastian Ingrosso, and Axwell, the trio who would go on to form Swedish House Mafia. His 2009 rework of Robin S.' "Show Me Love" (with Steve Angello) reached number 11 on the UK Singles Chart, introducing him to a mainstream audience beyond the club underground. Around the same time, he collaborated with Axwell, Ingrosso, and Angello on "Leave the World Behind" featuring Deborah Cox, a track that became one of the definitive anthems of the pre-EDM progressive house era.

=== 2010s: EDM, Mixmash Records, and mentorship ===
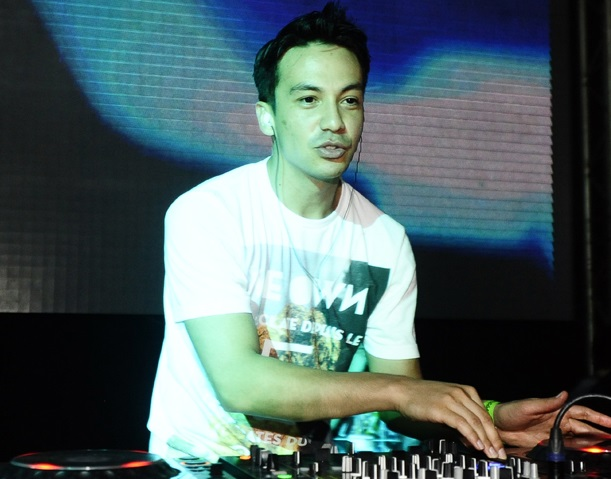
Luke performing in 2012

The early 2010s saw Luke riding the global wave of EDM's mainstream explosion, releasing high-profile collaborations that reached well beyond the club circuit. His 2011 single "Turbulence" with Steve Aoki featuring Lil Jon became one of the era's crowd-favorite festival anthems, released on Ultra Records and Dim Mak Records. That same year he released the studio album Cream Ibiza Super You & Me, tied to his long-running Super You & Me party brand, a concept rooted in community, costumes, and dancefloor celebration that he had nurtured since the early 2000s. He also appeared on Major Lazer's landmark 2013 album Free the Universe, contributing the track "Sweat" alongside Ms. Dynamite.

Beyond his own releases, Luke became widely recognized as one of electronic music's most generous mentors and talent scouts. Through Mixmash Records, the label he founded, he provided a platform for emerging artists and is widely credited with helping to identify and develop early-career talents including Avicii, Afrojack, Oliver Heldens, Nicky Romero, and Deorro, among others. He additionally ran an online production forum and YouTube channel dedicated to sharing knowledge about DJing and music production, establishing a reputation as a teacher as much as a performer.

In 2012, he was nominated for the Best European DJ award at the 27th Dance Music Awards. He appeared in the 2016 Grammy-nominated documentary about Steve Aoki titled I'll Sleep When I'm Dead, which offered a behind-the-scenes look at the EDM world he had helped build. His studio album Focus was released in 2015 on Mixmash Records, representing a more considered artistic statement amid the commercial peak of the EDM era. Throughout this period he performed regularly at the world's largest dance music festivals, including Tomorrowland, Ultra Music Festival, and Electric Daisy Carnival, as well as major residencies in Ibiza and Las Vegas. He also took on a role as a brand ambassador for Pioneer DJ during this period, later transitioning to partnerships with Denon DJ and other equipment manufacturers.

=== 2020s: Reinvention and the CODE/RED era ===
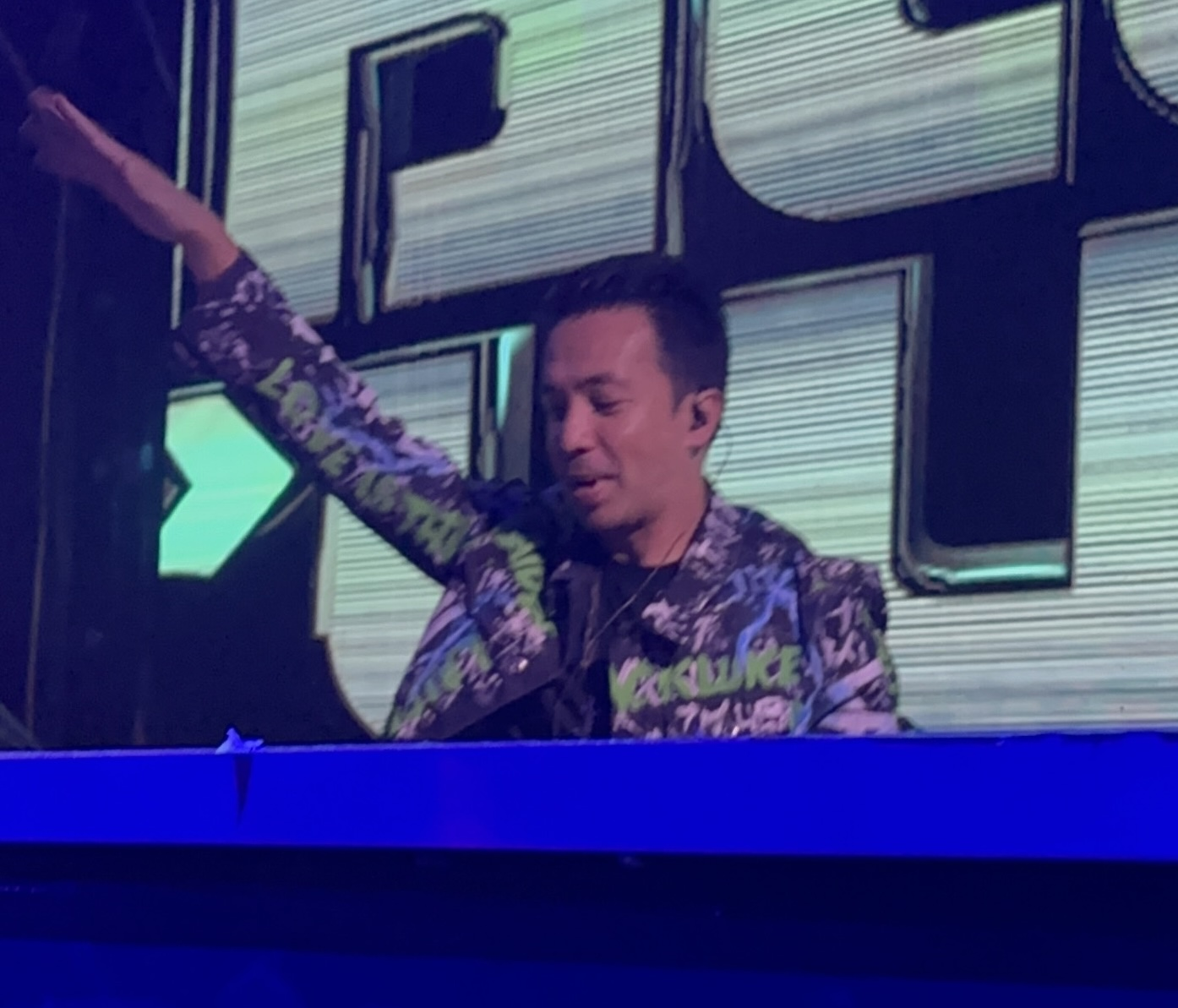
Luke performing in 2024

Following years of prolific output on Mixmash Records, including collaborations with Eva Simons, Ally Brooke, and GATTÜSO, Luke undertook a significant creative reinvention in 2025. He later described the period leading up to it as one of creative stagnation: "I had found myself in a decade-long mold, an artist who got stale, a style that became vanilla." The catalyst for change came when he rediscovered a DJ folder from 2007 and 2008, reigniting his passion for the raw Bloghouse and fidget house sounds of that era. He signed with Dim Mak Records, the label founded by Steve Aoki, and dedicated 2025 to what he publicly called a "year of rebellion," a deliberate return to unfiltered, high-energy artistry.

Throughout 2025, Luke released a series of singles on Dim Mak that embodied this new direction. "It Clicked", co-released with Future House Music, announced his sonic reset with gritty electro-house production reminiscent of the underground pioneers he had stood alongside in the late 2000s. He followed it with "1000 BPM", a collaboration with fellow Dim Mak artist Nostalgix built from a studio session at the Dim Mak offices in Los Angeles, and "Gasoline" with rising artist LINNEY, which was later performed together at a show at San Diego Comic-Con in July 2025, an event that also revived his Super You & Me brand in collaboration with the legacy of the late Stan Lee, who had famously contributed to the party concept in 2012. Perhaps the most notable release of the year was "I Got Soul (Super Bad)", a collaboration built around archival material from James Brown, a project Luke described as the biggest collaboration of his career, surpassing even his earlier work with Daft Punk, Madonna, and Donna Summer.

These singles were compiled into the CODE/RED EP, released on Dim Mak Records in late 2025, alongside a closing cover of "Now That We Found Love" that blended Bloghouse nostalgia with Dutch house energy. The EP was accompanied by the CODE/RED World Tour, a global run spanning clubs and festivals across North America, Europe, and beyond. Luke cited his performance at Avalon Los Angeles as the standout of the tour, during which he changed stages mid-show and incorporated surprise guests, turning what he described as a regular club night into a full event experience.

In early 2026, Luke announced that he had re-signed with Pioneer DJ (operating under its parent company AlphaTheta) as a brand ambassador, a reunion with the company he had originally represented during the CDJ-1000 era, before successive partnerships with Denon DJ, Algoriddim (djay Pro software), and Reloop. He was featured on the cover of DJ LIFE Magazine (Vol. 6, No. 1) in February 2026, and the CODE/RED World Tour continued into spring 2026, including a first-ever performance at Fifty Eight in San Juan, Puerto Rico, as well as upcoming dates in Las Vegas and Toronto.

== Personal life ==
Luke was previously married twice and has three children. He married his current wife, Ashley Reina van Scheppingen, on 22 February 2020. He has spoken openly in interviews about the demands of balancing a touring career with family life, and has described martial arts as a key outlet for managing the pressures of the music industry.

=== Martial arts ===
Laidback Luke has been a practitioner of kung fu, specifically the Choy Li Fut style, since his youth. He has described the discipline as a lifelong pursuit that runs parallel to his music career, crediting it with giving him focus, physical balance, and mental resilience on the road. He represented the Netherlands at the Kung Fu World Championship in China in 2013, and was featured on the cover of Men's Health NL in March 2018, where he spoke extensively about his training regimen and the role martial arts plays in his life. He has also taught kung fu and Tai Chi, and views the learning process in martial arts as directly analogous to his ongoing development as a DJ and producer. As of 2025–2026, he has additionally been training in Brazilian jiu-jitsu, a discipline he took up to expand his grappling skills beyond what his Choy Li Fut system covers, and has expressed plans to compete in his first BJJ competitions in 2026.

== Discography ==
=== Studio albums ===
Year	Title	Label	Notes
1998	Psyched Up	—	Not on streaming platforms
2002	Electronic Satisfaction	—	Not on streaming platforms
2011	Cream Ibiza Super You & Me	Mixmash	Not on streaming platforms
2015	Focus	Mixmash	
2021	Revealed Selected 030	Revealed Recordings	
2026	Laidback Luke Mini Mix	—	DJ mix compilation

=== Extended plays ===
Year	Title	Label
2025	CODE/RED	Dim Mak Records

=== Selected singles ===
Year	Title	Collaborators	Label
2009	"Show Me Love"	Steve Angello feat. Robin S.	—
2011	"Leave the World Behind"	Axwell, Sebastian Ingrosso, Steve Angello feat. Deborah Cox	Axtone
2011	"Turbulence"	Steve Aoki feat. Lil Jon	Ultra / Dim Mak
2011	"Natural Disaster"	Example	—
2013	"Sweat"	Major Lazer, Ms. Dynamite	Mad Decent
2014	"1234"	Chuckie, Martin Solveig	Mixmash
2015	"S.A.X."	Tujamo	Mixmash
2015	"Collide"	Project 46 feat. Collin McLoughlin	Mixmash
2016	"The Chase"	GTA feat. Aruna	Mixmash
2016	"To The Beat"	Yves V feat. Hawkboy	Mixmash
2017	"Beat of the Drum"	Angger Dimas feat. Mina	Mixmash
2017	"Get It Right"	MOSKA feat. Terri B!	Mixmash
2018	"Bae"	Gina Turner	Mixmash
2018	"Milkshake (Better Than Yours)"	Shermanology	Mixmash
2019	"It's Time"	Steve Aoki feat. Bruce Buffer	Dim Mak / Mixmash
2020	"Paradise"	Made In June feat. Bright Lights	Dim Mak
2021	"Whistle"	feat. Bertie Scott	Mixmash
2021	"Can't Hold My Tongue"	feat. SXMSON	Mixmash
2022	"Heart On My Sleeve"	GATTÜSO feat. Sarah Reeves	Ultra
2022	"Flexin'"	feat. Eva Simons	Mixmash
2023	"Rolling Stone"	feat. David Goncalves	Mixmash
2023	"Dance It Off"	feat. Ally Brooke	Mixmash
2024	"One On One"	feat. marlonbeats	Dim Mak
2025	"It Clicked"	—	Dim Mak / Future House Music
2025	"1000 BPM"	Nostalgix	Dim Mak
2025	"Gasoline"	LINNEY	Dim Mak
2025	"I Got Soul (Super Bad)"	James Brown	Dim Mak
2025	"Sippin'"	—	Dim Mak
2025	"Now That We Found Love"	—	Dim Mak
2026	"Late Night Talk"	—	—
2026	"Late Night Talk (BLR Edit)"	—	—
2026	"3 Days (Remix)"	Steve Aoki	—
2026	"Sex Machine (Remixes)"	James Brown	Dim Mak
