= The Interlude =

EP by Asiahn
- Released: January 11, 2021
- Genres: Contemporary R&B; alternative R&B; trap
- Length: 12:26
- Labels: Motown; SinceThe80s
- Producers: Asiahn Bryant; Dernst "D'Mile" Emile II; Andre Robertson; Sinéad Harnett; Terrance Williams; Ross James; Ed Thomas

Asiahn chronology
Love Train 2 (2019)	The Interlude (2021)	The Interlude (Orchestral Performance) (2021)

Singles from The Interlude
- 1. "Gucci Frames" Released: August 28, 2020; 2. "Get Away" Released: November 13, 2020

The Interlude is the third extended play (EP) by American singer-songwriter Asiahn. It was released on January 11, 2021, through Motown and SinceThe80s. Preceding the release of the EP, "Gucci Frames" was released on August 28, 2020, followed by "Get Away" on November 13, 2020. The Interlude debuted at No. 25 on the Heatseekers Albums chart and No. 48 on the Top Current Album Sales chart, with 2,000 album-equivalent units earned.

== Track listing ==
The Interlude track listing
No.	Title	Length
1.	"My World"	3:11
2.	"Gucci Frames" (featuring Grandmaster Vic)	2:11
3.	"Get Away"	2:36
4.	"Drunk"	0:56
5.	"Messed Up" (featuring Jordan Hawkins)	3:32
Total length:		12:26

== Charts ==
Chart performance for The Interlude
Chart (2021)	Peak position
US Heatseekers Albums (Billboard)	25
US Top Current Album Sales (Billboard)	48
