= Asiahn =

American singer-songwriter (born 1987)

- Also known as: Asia Bryant / Asia
- Born: Asiahn Bryant; November 24, 1987 (age 38); Paterson, New Jersey
- Origin: Charleston, South Carolina
- Genre: Alternative R&B
- Occupations: Singer, songwriter Voice actress
- Instruments: Vocals, piano, guitar, bass guitar
- Years active: 2010–present
- Labels: SinceThe80s; Motown; Def Jam (non-musical career only)

Asiahn (previously Asia Bryant and born November 24, 1987), also known as Asiahn Bryant, is an American singer-songwriter and voice actress from Paterson, New Jersey, currently signed to the SinceThe80s and Motown record labels. From 2021 to 2022, alongside her music, she provided vocal performances for Karma Grant in the Ludacris-created Netflix streaming musical series, Karma's World.

== Early life ==
Bryant was born in Paterson, New Jersey, and moved with her family to Charlotte, North Carolina as a baby. She used music as an outlet while dealing with the divorce of her parents and the death of her brother. Where she later relocated to Hanahan, South Carolina with her mother and sister. She attended Hanahan high school where she was a cheerleader. She would spend most of her free time, traveling back-and-forth to Atlanta to work on her talents.

== Musical career ==
In the early stages of Bryant's music career, she met Craig King who took her under his wing worked on her artistic development with A&R James Bennett. She started touring a few years later and opened up for Ludacris, T.I., Kanye West, and Erykah Badu. In 2010 and 2011, she featured on background vocals for Quincy Jones' Q: Soul Bossa Nostra and Killer Mike's PL3DGE. In 2011, Bryant began her mainstream musical career by signing a publishing deal with Universal Music Group, and releasing her debut extended play (EP) album Analog Girl X Digital World on June 7 that year under the Motown record label.

In 2013, she was a co-songwriter on "Hands in the Air", a song by Miley Cyrus from her album Bangerz. In 2014, she co-wrote the "Booty" and "Girls" singles for Jennifer Lopez. In 2015, Asiahn Bryant worked with The Game and was featured on the latter's albums Compton and The Documentary 2.5, and was featured in the soundtrack for the 2015 film Straight Outta Compton. She contributed vocal performances on Ludaversal, an album by Ludacris. In 2016, she worked on two Fox musical drama TV series, first collaborating with Ne-Yo as a co-writer on a soundtrack for the second season of Empire, then co-writing songs for Star the following year.

In 2017, Bryant released her second EP Love Train produced by Cardiak. Both continued to work together on the sequel Love Train 2, which was released in 2019. On January 11, 2021, Bryant released The Interlude EP distributed by SinceThe80s and Motown, which featured guest appearances from Grandmaster Vic and Jordan Hawkins. Following the release of the EP, she debuted at on the Billboard Emerging Artists Spotlight. On March 18, 2021, she released a live version of the EP with orchestral performances of each song.

In April 2024, Bryant performed at the third annual Cultura Festival, at the The Royal American, a multi-day event which showcased Black artists, in the city of Charleston, South Carolina, along with other DJs and hip-hop and R&B music artists.

In May 2025, Bryant released her third studio album, entitled "Free." She described it, to Vibe, as a world where "R&B meets liberation" with every note and lyric as a "step towards freedom—freedom from the past, freedom from unlearned lessons, and freedom to embrace love without restraint," describing it as not "just an album" but "an experience."

== Non-musical career ==
From mid-2021, alongside her music, she was cast as and began providing vocal performances for Karma Grant in a Netflix animated musical series, Karma's World, created by Ludacris (who himself provides the voice of her dad in the series). Both worked on a song which is featured on its official soundtrack album, whiles Asiahn alone worked on the rest of the entries of that album, including the theme song which has its own music video released on YouTube. The Karma's World soundtrack album is currently the only album Asiahn features in, either as the lead or back-up, not released by either SinceThe80s or Motown.

== Personal life ==
Bryant told the Grammy Awards, in June 2019, that she is a lesbian and that being a part of the LGBTQ+ community is important to her, adding she is "an advocate and a person in the music industry to represent for so many others who don't get that representation in the music industry," with her single about loving another woman, named "Like You", doing well on the radio. She also said that there should be "some more representation out there," but there are other "people who aren't represented." In November 2020, in an interview, she described herself as a mix of "chocolate, melanated, Black Girl Magic, lesbian, nerd and anime aficionado" all in one.

Vibe noted her official music video for her song "Fall Back," in November 2021, showcased the "nuances of Black queer romance," with a situationship, with Asiahn telling the magazine that the song's story is true, saying everyone has been "in a situation where we're trying to get to know someone casually" but people end up falling in love anyway. The same year she told Billboard that her music is grounded in "positivity, self love, finding yourself, sexy, ethereal, soulful, healing, boss talk, and...girls that love girls." On her official website, she describes herself as a lesbian, saying she wanted to "paint that picture of a woman" with her single NOLA.

On January 29, 2024, Bryant announced that she was engaged to DJ Jay Shalé, after both had proposed to each other. They had previously met on social media in 2019 but did not make their first interaction as a couple until October 24, 2022, with Shalé saying she proposed because she "wanted Asiahn to know that she will always be handled with care and...was hoping she would be able to see the time and care I put into making sure that night was very special." Shalé later described Bryant as her fiancee and celebrated the release of her single, "Wassup Wit It" in April 2025.

== Discography ==
=== Studio albums ===
Title	Details
Love Train	Released: January 7, 2017; Label: Self-released; Format: Digital download
Love Train 2	Released: January 11, 2019; Label: SinceThe80s; Format: Digital download
Free	Released: August 30, 2024; Label: Love Train Records; Format: Digital download

=== Extended plays ===
Title	Details
Analog Girl X Digital World	Released: June 7, 2011; Label: Universal Music Group; Format: Digital download
The Interlude	Released: January 11, 2021; Label: SinceThe80s, Motown; Format: Digital download
The Interlude (Orchestral Performance)	Released: March 18, 2021; Label: SinceThe80s, Motown; Format: Digital download
Asiahn: Celebrating Pride	Released: 2022; Label: UMG Recordings; Format: Digital download

=== Soundtrack album ===
Album	Release date	Other artist(s)	Type	Release format(s)
Karma's World (Official Soundtrack Album)	October 15, 2021	Ramone Hilton, Ludacris (1 song each; as collaboration)	Soundtrack album	Digital download; Streaming music; Music download

=== Singles ===
==== As lead artist ====
Title	Year	Album
"Stranger"	2017	Non-album single
"NOLA"	2018	Love Train 2
"Like You"	2018	Love Train 2
"Gucci Frames"	2020	The Interlude
"Get Away"	2020	The Interlude
"OMW"	2021	Non-album single
"Fall Back"	2021	Non-album single
"We Can"	2022	Non-album single
"What She Wants"	2022	Non-album single
"When It Comes to You"	2022	Non-album single
"DO BAD"	2023	Free
"FEEL GOOD"	2023	Free
"IJS"	2024	Free
"WASSUP WITH IT"	2025	Free

=== Guest appearances ===
List of non-single guest appearances, with other performing artists, showing year released and album name
Title	Year	Other artist(s)	Album
"Earline's Son"	2011	Playboy Tre	—N/a
"Come With Me"	2012	Dolla Boy	—N/a
"Just Another Day"	2015	The Game	Compton
"Gang Related"	2015	The Game	The Documentary 2.5
"Invitation"	2017	K Camp	K.I.S.S. 4
"All I Want"	2020	—N/a	A Motown Holiday

== Writing discography ==
List of non-performed songs as writer, showing performing artists, year released and album name
Title	Year	Artist	Album
"God in the Building II"	2011	Killer Mike	PL3DGE
"Hands in the Air"	2013	Miley Cyrus, Ludacris	Bangerz
"My Baby"	2013	Ai, Lloyd	Moriagaro
"Booty"	2014	Jennifer Lopez, Pitbull	A.K.A.
"Booty (Remix)"	2014	Jennifer Lopez, Iggy Azalea	A.K.A.
"Girls"	2014	Jennifer Lopez	A.K.A.
"Girls (Remix)"	2014	Jennifer Lopez, Tyga	A.K.A.
"Shine on Me"	2016	Jussie Smollett, Bre-Z	Empire: Original Soundtrack Season 2 Volume 2
"Little Bird"	2017	Star Cast	—N/a
"Imagination"	2017	Star Cast	—N/a
