= Work It Out Wombats! =

American animated children's TV series

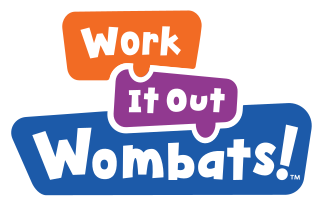
- Genre: Preschool; Educational; Comedy
- Created by: Kathy Waugh; Marcy Gunther; Robby Hoffman; Marisa Wolsky
- Voices of: Ian Ho; Nylan Parthipan; Mia Swami-Nathan; Rain Janjua; Yanna McIntosh
- Theme music composer: Bill Sherman; Nina Woodford-Wells
- Opening theme: "Work It Out Wombats! Theme"
- Ending theme: "Work It Out Wombats! Theme" (instrumental)
- Composers: Steve D'Angelo; Lorenzo Castelli; Terry Tompkins; Asher Lenz; Fabiola Mendez; Stephen Skratt
- Countries of origin: United States; Canada
- Original language: English
- No. of seasons: 2
- No. of episodes: 53 (106 segments)

Production
- Executive producers: Marcy Gunther; Marisa Wolsky; Luis Lopez; Juan Lopez
- Running time: 22 minutes (11 minutes per segment)
- Production companies: Pipeline Studios; GBH Kids

Original release
- Network: PBS Kids (United States); TVOKids/Knowledge Kids (Canada)
- Release: February 6, 2023 – present

Work It Out Wombats! is a children's animated television series that premiered on February 6, 2023, on PBS Kids. The series is produced by GBH Kids and Pipeline Studios. The series also has a podcast, which premiered on January 4, 2024. Reception to the series has been mostly positive. The series was renewed for a second season that premiered on June 9, 2025.

== Premise ==
In the land of the Treeborhood, the series follows marsupials Malik, Zadie and Zeke living with their grandmother (Super) in her apartment complex. Every episode features them encountering a problem of some kind and using computational thinking to solve it.

In-between each of the episodes is a 90-second music video, similar to other shows on PBS (except for steps to play or do something). This is replaced by short stories showing computer-generated puppet versions of Zeke and Snout in Season 2.

== Characters ==
The main and supporting cast of the series. From left to right: Louisa, Duffy, Quique, Sammy, Leiko, Mr. E, Ellie, Super (holding Malik, Zeke, & Zadie), JunJun, Gabriela, Kaya, Kat, Cece, Amado, Carly, Kit & Clyde (The Fishmans, Sylvia, Buckley and Beatrice, Uncle Duper, Buzby, Devonte, Jean-Michel, Marie, Murphy, Bex, Sasha, Tabitha, Yolanda and Benito are not in this picture.)

=== Main ===
- Malik (voiced by Ian Ho in Season 1 and Nylan Parthipan in Season 2) is a playful and curious 8-year-old (starting off at a 7 year old) grey wombat and the oldest of the siblings. He is meticulous and organized, but nonetheless likes having fun with his siblings.
- Zadie (voiced by Mia SwamiNathan) is a 6-year-old (later 7-year-old) purple wombat and the middle child of the siblings. She likes to create fantastical ideas that are shown in a cardboard/puffball/popsicle stick art style.
- Zeke (voiced by Rain Janjua) is a playful 4-year-old (later 5-year-old) yellow wombat and the youngest of the siblings. He usually carries a stuffed animal named Snout with him, and is fond of asking lots of questions and talking nonstop.
- Super (voiced by Yanna McIntosh) is a fifty-something pink-haired cyan wombat who is the wombats' grandmother as well as the superintendent of the Treeborhood. She is open minded. She has a brother named Duper who lives in another town miles away. She has many friends which include Beatrice Beaver and Chanáa.

=== Recurring ===
- Mr. E (voiced by Joseph Motiki) is an iguana who owns the Everything Emporium. He is very organized and does care for the wombats but doesn't like their antics. He has a crush on Ellie, and she is the only person that he is openly affectionate towards. His friend is Sundaram.
- Ellie (voiced by Tymika Tafari) is a moose of Jamaican descent who is the Treeborhood's EMT. She is reliable and very kind-hearted. Some of her interests include fitness and jumping on a trampoline.
- Louisa (voiced by Claire Mackness) is an intelligent 4-year-old adopted pink tarsier who wants to know everything. Her catchphrase is "Did/do you not know?". She is good friends with Zeke.
- Leiko and Duffy (voiced by Ana Sani and Shoshana Sperling, respectively) are a pair of kangaroos who are a lesbian couple and the adoptive mothers of Louisa. They used to be in a rock music duo together. Duffy works at Eat 'N Greet, while Leiko is the COO of the Creation Station.
- Sammy (voiced by Baeyen Hoffman) is an 8-year-old (starting off at a 7 year old) orange laid-back emerald tree boa snake with Puerto Rican heritage. He always wears a red cap, and is good friends with Malik.
- Quique, real name Enrique (voiced by B'atz' Recinos) is the father of Sammy. He is a teacher at the Starlight Room. He has a wife named Yolanda whom he had divorced but still remains contact by taking turns in taking care of their son.
- JunJun (voiced by Roman Pesino in Season 1, and Elijah-Justus Lewis in Season 2) is a playful 6-year-old Philippine Eagle who likes singing and playing guitar. He occasionally speaks Tagalog words. He is good friends with Zadie.
- Kaya (voiced by Gianelle Miranda) is JunJun's 17-year-old (starting off at 16 years old) sister. She is a waitress at the Eat 'N Greet and a social media influencer.
- Amado (voiced by Mark Andrada) is JunJun and Kaya's father. He is the arborist of the Treeborhood and frequently cuts topiary trees. He wears a red barong tagalog.
- Gabriela (voiced by Carolyn Fe) is JunJun and Kaya's grandmother. She is the local mail carrier.
- Carly, CeCe, and Clyde (all voiced by Julie Lemieux), Kat (voiced by Athena Karkanis), and Kit (voiced by Dan Chameroy) are a green fiddler crab family who are farmers at the Sow 'N Grow. They are rather timid. Carly, CeCe, and Clyde are triplets who function as a single character. Carly wears red, CeCe wears green, and Clyde wears blue. Also, CeCe is the only crab who wears square glasses while Kit, Kat, Carly and Clyde wear round glasses. Kit and Kat are their father and mother.
- Fergus and Felicia Fishman (voiced by Michael Gordin Shore and Athena Karkanis, respectively) are a married couple of fish entrepreneurs who live in a tank near the top of the Treeborhood.
  - Flip, Frannie, and Finn Fishman (voiced by Various Sound Effects Libraries, either often or sometimes) are the three children of Fergus and Felicia. Because they are only just babies, they do not talk, except for in "The Fishman's Big Date" and "Fishman Family Circus", their first word was "Eww!".
- Sylvia (voiced by Paloma Nuñez) is a white cow with lavender spots, dark blue glasses, and curly maroon hair. She wears a purple button-up shirt. She drives a train that runs on the ground instead of on rails.
- Duper (also known as Great Uncle Duper, voiced by Martin Roach) is Malik, Zadie, and Zeke's granduncle and Super's brother. Oddly, being in a place with loud noises helps him sleep.
- Buckley (voiced by Jayd Deroché) is a beaver and the wombats' friend.
- Beatrice (voiced by Linda Ballantyne) is Buckley's aunt.
- Yolanda (voiced by Margarita Valderrama) is the ex-wife of Quique and Sammy's mother. She lives in the Flowerhood, a place with giant flowers.
- Benito (voiced by Juan Pablo Romero) is Sammy's younger but taller cousin. Benito speaks Spanish in the English version and English in the Spanish version.
- Race Announcer (voiced by Joseph Motiki) appears in the episode "Balloonie for Youie".
- Buzby (voiced by Marlowe Davidson) is a bee that lives in the Undergroundborhood.
- Game Show Host (voiced by Dan Chameroy) is a flamingo. He has violet-red hair, pink body, a dark and light blue bow-tie, a green jacket, and a blue handsome shirt.
- Unnamed Zebra (voiced by Tymika Tafari) appears in the episode "The Treeborhood Cause and Effect Machine".
- Chanáa (voiced by Lawrence Bayne) is a raven from Alaska and is one of Super's oldest friends.
- Nani (voiced by Leslie Adlam) is a supporting character from Jamaica, just like her granddaughter Ellie.
- Devonte (voiced by Myles-Anthony Douglas) is a purple Haitian squirrel who made his debut in "Welcome to the Treeborhood". He is fond of technology and building things.
- Jean-Michel (voiced by Louco St Fleur) is one of the squirrel residents of the Treeborhood. He is the father of Devonte. He is one of the cooks asides Duffy and owns a food truck, as shown in "Welcome to the Treeborhood"
- Marie (voiced by Jenny Brizard) is one of the squirrel residents of the Treeborhood. She is the mother of Devonte and the wife of Jean-Michel, who is a cook. She teaches dance—mostly kompa and her nationality is Hatian-American.
- Sasha (known as Sasha the Singing Salamander, voiced by Kudakwashe Rutendo) is a salamander who sings.
- Bex (voiced by Daphne Reynolds) is a purple raccoon that has a hearing aid and a cochlear implant that makes her debut in "Bex Splash Fest".
- Murphy (voiced by DJ Demers) is Bex's dad. He also wears a hearing aid.
- The Flapping Feathers is a bird band whose members are Jose (rooster, voiced by Carlos Diaz), Enrique (ostrich, voiced by Sebastian Marziali), and Luna (penguin, voiced by Dani Romero). They appear in "The Treeborhood Parranda".
- Babby (voiced by Dan Chameroy) is a small electronic speaker powered by artificial intelligence, appearing in "A Day Out with Babby".
- Sheera (voiced by Athena Karkanis) is a blue sheep who is a barber. She made her debut in "Zadie's Horrible Haircut".
- Tabitha (voiced by Katie Griffin) is Louisa's tarsier birth mom who gave her up for adoption to Leiko and Duffy. She is seen on the USA-banned, Canada-only seen episode entitled "Louisa's Home Movie".
- Sundaram (voiced by Raoul Bhaneja) is a supporting character who first appeared in "Diwali in the Treeborhood".

== Episodes ==
=== Series overview ===
Season	Episodes	Originally released	
Season	Episodes	First released	Last released
1	39	February 6, 2023	March 25, 2025
2	13	June 9, 2025	September 4, 2026

=== Season 1 (2023–2025) ===
No.	Title	Directed by	Written by	Original release date	Prod. code
1	"Snout and About"	Jeff Barker	Kathy Waugh; Robby Hoffman (story by)	February 6, 2023	103
1	"Zadie's Shell Shuffle"	Jeff Barker	Jiro C. Okada	February 6, 2023	103
When Zeke loses his favorite stuffed toy, Snout, the wombats need to retrace their steps to find Snout. While playing hide-and-seek, Zadie accidentally rearranges the shells in Mr. E's garden, so she needs to rearrange it in the specific pattern that it was in. Song: "Cause and Effect" written by Randy Rogel, Super sings about cause and effect.
2	"Junior Supers"	Jeff Barker	Monique D. Hall	February 6, 2023	101
2	"Measure for Measure"	Jeff Barker	Deanna Oliver	February 6, 2023	101
Song: "Break It Down" written by Joe Fallon, the wombats make a sandwich by breaking the jobs down into little jobs.
3	"Special Delivery"	Jeff Barker	Sherri Stoner	February 7, 2023	104
3	"Campout Confusion"	Jeff Barker	Kathy Waugh	February 7, 2023	104
Sammy is sick, and Malik wants to deliver ice cream to him. But, he needs to find a way to stop the ice cream from melting. Zadie wants to host a fun campout, and invites the crab kids to it. Things did not go as expected, because she did not plan initially. Song: "The More I Try, The More I Know" song by Andrea Leon-Ramos, the wombats try out different scents for Super's bubble bath.
4	"Snout Wash Day"	Jeff Barker	Cusi Cram & Peter K. Hirsch	February 8, 2023	102
4	"A Super Recipe"	Jeff Barker	Nida Chowdhry	February 8, 2023	102
Snout gets very dirty and needs to be cleaned up, but Malik accidentally spills soap on the instructions. The wombats want to make cornbread for Grandma Super, but when they lose the cookbook, they need to create the recipe by other means. Song: "What Do You See?" written by Sofia Geck, Mr. E, Ellie, and Zeke sing about how they view art from their different perspectives.
5	"Summerweenie Halloweenie"	Jeff Barker	Deanna Oliver	February 9, 2023	110
5	"Make It Snow"	Jeff Barker	Michael Olmo	February 9, 2023	110
The wombats go trick-or-treating in summer (Pretty unusual, right?) and learn how to organize their treats by size and color. Mr. E didn't seem to enjoy Halloween at first, but he grows to love it when he joins the wombats. After Mr. E shows the wombats a snow globe, they decide to make their own giant snow globe, and search for materials that could stand in for snow. Song: "Mystery Box" written by Andrea Leon-Ramos, JunJun and Malik try to guess what's inside Louisa's mystery box.
6	"Crab Quakes"	Jeff Barker	Deanna Oliver	February 13, 2023	106
6	"Hopping Helpers"	Jeff Barker	Crescent Imani Novell	February 13, 2023	106
The crabs are scared by something they heard, so they run away to the wombats' house to seek refuge. The wombats take it upon themselves to solve the mystery of what made the noise. They figure out that the noise is revealed to come from a wind-up dragon toy. Malik, Zadie, and Zeke realize that it feels good to help others, so they become the "Hopping Helpers" and try to help everyone in the Treeborhood. But with all the tasks they have to do, they realize that even helpers need help sometimes. Song: "What's Going On?" written by Glen Berger, the wombats find out what's making a scary shadow in their room.
7	"Brother Day"	Jeff Barker	Darnell Lamont Walker	February 14, 2023	107
7	"Cafe Chaos"	Jeff Barker	Cooper Sweeney	February 14, 2023	107
After Duffy sprains her ankle, Zeke and Louisa become waiters at the Eat N' Greet. However, waiting so many tables at once proves to be difficult for them, and they keep messing up the orders. Quique helps them memorize the steps to being a waiter. With Zeke and Louisa's help and skills, Mr. E's meal with Ellie is successful. Song: "Collaborate" written by Stacey Greenberger, the wombats work together to get a box to the top of the hill.
8	"The Sleepover"	Jeff Barker	Glen Berger & Peter Ferland	February 15, 2023	109
8	"Secret Tunnels"	Jeff Barker	Chuck Tately	February 15, 2023	109
Zeke attends a sleepover at the Creation Station with Louisa and the crab children, but the activities at the sleepover are nothing like his usual bedtime routine. When the wombats want to deliver books to the crabs, Super shows them a secret network of passageways in the underbelly of the Treeborhood. Zeke loses his book, so the wombats have to navigate the tunnels to find it. Song: "One Part at a Time" written by Sofia Geck, Ellie teaches Malik the steps to a dance.
9	"The Mighty Zeke"	Jeff Barker	Michael Olmo	February 16, 2023	105
9	"Gift For a Fish"	Jeff Barker	Kathy Waugh	February 16, 2023	105
Malik and Zadie help Zeke ride a bike. The Fishmans just had their babies, and the wombats are invited to their fish shower. The wombats come up with the perfect gift for the fish babies. Song: "Sandcastle Song" written by Pierce Freelon, the crab children try different ways to get their sandcastle to stay up.
10	"Me Time"	Jeff Barker	Cusi Cram & Peter Hirsch	February 20, 2023	108
10	"Zadie and the Really Big, Really Loud Noisy Thing"	Jeff Barker	Sherri Stoner; Kathy Waugh (story by)	February 20, 2023	108
After they find out that Super takes time off for herself every day, Malik and Zadie set out to do the same. Zadie needs to find a place where she can make loud noises. Song: "Pattern Song" written by Randy Rogel, Super sings about patterns.
11	"Talent Turmoil"	Jeff Barker	Cooper Sweeney	February 21, 2023	114
11	"Zeke's Collection Selection"	Jeff Barker	Darnell Lamont Walker	February 21, 2023	114
The Treeborhood is having a talent show, and Zeke is in charge of everyone's props. Trouble arises when the props are put in the wrong order. The Treeborhood is holding a collection fair, so Zeke tries to create his own collection. Song: "Same But Different" written by Randy Rogel, Zadie and Malik sing about similarities and differences.
12	"Helper For the Day"	Jeff Barker	Deanna Oliver	February 22, 2023	113
12	"Racecar Wombats"	Jeff Barker	Jessica Tsou	February 22, 2023	113
Zeke helps Mr. E sort things at the Everything Emporium. The wombats want to participate in the Treeborhood Derby, but struggle to get their homemade box race car out in time for the race before it starts Song: "The Clean-Up Song" song by Ron Holsey, the wombats sing a song while cleaning their room.
13	"Sparklepants"	Jeff Barker	Glen Berger & Peter Ferland	February 27, 2023	111
13	"Game Changer"	Jeff Barker	Sherri Stoner; Robby Hoffman (story by)	February 27, 2023	111
While preparing for Ellie's welcome home party, Mr. E accidentally orders 200 pairs of Sparklepants. It is up to JunJun and Zadie to figure out what to do with the pants before Ellie gets home from her vacation. Everybody in the Treeborhood are too busy to play with Zadie so she decides to play with the crab kids. They all try to find a game that they can all enjoy. Meanwhile, Zeke and Malik collect umbrellas. Song: "Set the Table" song by Ron Holsey, the wombats learn to set the table before their meal.
14	"Bake It Til You Make It"	Jeff Barker	Rachel Reuben	February 28, 2023	112
14	"Zoom In Zadie"	Jeff Barker	Atul N. Rao	February 28, 2023	112
Zeke and Louisa sell mud pies in exchange for stickers, but they need to figure out how to bake a perfect pie. Mr. E has never been able to paint a square. Zadie tries to get the others to help but realizes that she needs to take a good picture to send to the Treeborhood newsletter. Song: "Step It Out" song by Ron Holsey, the wombats go over the steps they need to get ready for the beach.
15	"Moo Moo Choo Choo"	Jeff Barker	Sherri Stoner	July 24, 2023	119
15	"Lake Bellyflop"	Jeff Barker	Crystal Villarreal	July 24, 2023	119
The wombats help to free the Moo Moo Choo Choo train, which got itself stuck in a sea of mud. First spied through a telescope, the wombats attempt to find the mystical Bellyflop Lake without getting lost. Song: "The Wombat Wiggle" song by Ron Holsey, the wombats show a dance called the Wombat Wiggle and the other Treeborhood residents join in the fun.
16	"3,2,1 Lift Off!"	Jeff Barker	Natalie Vazquez	July 25, 2023	118
16	"Moon Magic"	Jeff Barker	Kathy Waugh	July 25, 2023	118
The wombats journey to the Moon and look for unicorns. Song: "Don't Go Duffy and Leiko" song by Glen Berger, the wombats encourage Leiko and Duffy to keep trying, even if they fall.
17	"Color Fun"	Jeff Barker	Darnell Lamont Walker	July 26, 2023	122
17	"A Super Invention"	Jeff Barker	Deanna Oliver	July 26, 2023	122
The wombats make up a color game. Song (repeat from episode 1): "Cause and Effect" written by Randy Rogel, Super sings about cause and effect.
18	"A Sleep Story for Ellie"	Jeff Barker	Sherri Stoner	July 27, 2023	121
18	"Super's Super Mug"	Jeff Barker	Mercedes Brazier-Thurman	July 27, 2023	121
Song (repeat from episode 5): "Mystery Box" written by Andrea Leon-Ramos, JunJun and Malik try to guess what's inside Louisa's mystery box.
19	"JunJun's Wake Up Call"	Jeff Barker	Cheyenne "Casper" Lynn	July 31, 2023	120
19	"Stack 'Em Up"	Jeff Barker	Rachel Reuben	July 31, 2023	120
Song: "It's Pancake Day" song by Ron Holsey, The wombats choose pancake toppings.
20	"A Boxful of Snout"	Jeff Barker	Chuck Tately	August 1, 2023	117
20	"Postcard from Snout"	Jeff Barker	Deanna Oliver	August 1, 2023	117
The wombats lose Snout while helping Mr. E wrap boxes. Snout sends a postcard to Zeke. Song: "The Day is Over, Night is On its Way" song by Kathy Waugh, the wombats sing a lullaby to all the Treeborhood.
21	"Amazing Adventure"	Jeff Barker	Crescent Imani Novell	August 2, 2023	116
21	"Kayatastic Split"	Jeff Barker	Jehan Madhani & Sherri Stoner	August 2, 2023	116
Song: "Don't Cry Little Fishes" song by Pierce Freelon, Ellie babysits the Fishmans' children.
22	"The Treeborhood Photo Album"	Jeff Barker	Sherri Stoner	August 3, 2023	115
22	"Runway Recycling"	Jeff Barker	Tavashia Berry	August 3, 2023	115
The wombats learn about the history of their tree which they grew up in. Mr. E judges a sculpture contest. Song: "Drip, Drop" song by Andrea Leon-Ramos, the wombats wait for a few days until the rain stops.
23	"The Treeborhood Harvest Day"	Jeff Barker & Andrea Gerstmann	Kathy Waugh	November 13, 2023	130
23	"The Treeborhood Thankfulness Stew"	Jeff Barker & Andrea Gerstmann	Sherri Stoner	November 13, 2023	130
The Treeborhood's Harvest Day may be canceled due to fog, so Zadie and Malik help Mr. E find some fog goggles. Zeke and Louisa make a special stew on Thanksgiving while the other children at the Treeborhood play a game. Song (repeat from episode 7): "Collaborate" written by Stacey Greenberger, the wombats work together to get a box to the top of the hill.
24	"Part 1: The Treeborhood Parranda"	Jeff Barker & Andrea Gerstmann	Natalie Vazquez	December 4, 2023	133
24	"Part 2: Happy New Acorn Year!"	Jeff Barker & Andrea Gerstmann	Michael Olmo	December 4, 2023	133
The Treeborhood is having a parranda. The wombats try to stay up late on New Year's Eve. Song (repeat from episode 8): "One Part at a Time" written by Sofia Geck, Ellie teaches Malik the steps to a dance.
25	"A Room of Our Own"	Jeff Barker	Kathy Waugh; Cusi Cram & Peter Hirsh (story by)	March 11, 2024	123
25	"Zeke's Fairy Village"	Jeff Barker	Jessica Tsou	March 11, 2024	123
Song (repeat from episode 2): "Break It Down" written by Joe Fallon, the wombats make a sandwich by breaking the jobs down into small parts.
26	"A House for Snout"	Jeff Barker	Cooper Sweeney	March 12, 2024	124
26	"JunJun's Brain Freeze"	Jeff Barker	Sofia Geck	March 12, 2024	124
Zeke and Louisa plan a house for Snout. If they can manage to stop arguing, they might even get around to building it. "Hooray for Spring!" is the title of the video Kaya hopes she will make, once JunJun conquers his on-camera phobias. Song (repeat from episode 9): "Sandcastle Song" written by Pierce Freelon, the crab kids try different ways to get their sandcastle to stay up.
27	"Treeborhood Carnaval"	Jeff Barker	Michael Olmo	March 13, 2024	125
27	"Magic Tricky"	Jeff Barker	Glen Berger & Peter Ferland	March 13, 2024	125
Malik the Magnificent is about to perform a magic trick, but cannot seem to get it right. Song (repeat from episode 6): "What's Going On?" written by Glen Berger, the wombats find out what's making a scary shadow in their room.
28	"Malik Gets Muddy"	Jeff Barker	Shemeka Foster	March 14, 2024	126
28	"Balloonasaur Delivery"	Jeff Barker	Chuck Tately	March 14, 2024	126
Malik goes on a journey in the Undergroundberhood to retrieve JunJun's favorite ball when it ends up there. The wombats cheer Buckley up, using balloons. Song (repeat from episode 14): "Step It Out" song by Ron Holsey, the wombats go over the steps they need to get ready for the beach.
29	"Sticker Monster Storytime"	Jeff Barker	Rachel Reuben	March 15, 2024	127
29	"Count to 10!"	Jeff Barker	Dejen Tesfagiorgis	March 15, 2024	127
Super hunts for a lost sticker while the wombats collaborate on a new ending for an old Sticker Monster Story. Malik and Zadie go all over the Treeborhood so they can help Zeke learn how to count to 10. Song (repeat from episode 4): "What Do You See?" song by Sofia Geck, Mr. E, Ellie, and Zeke sing about how they view art differently.
30	"The Wombat Family Road Trip"	Jeff Barker and Andrea Gerstmann	Deanna Oliver	July 1, 2024	140
30	"A Super Duper Wombat Whirlgig"	Jeff Barker and Andrea Gerstmann	Sherri Stoner	July 1, 2024	140
The Wombats are off to visit their Great Uncle Duper in the Windborhood by taking the Moo Moo Choo Choo. The World's Biggest Whirligig has blown away. Because of that, the wombats are there to help Great Uncle Duper imagine how they can build a new one. Song (repeat from episode 15): "The Wombat Wiggle" song by Ron Holsey, the wombats show a dance called the Wombat Wiggle and the other Treeborhood residents join in the fun.
31	"Zadie to the Rescue"	Jeff Barker and Andrea Gerstmann	James Eason-Garcia	July 2, 2024	128
31	"Cake Mistake"	Jeff Barker and Andrea Gerstmann	Charity L. Miller	July 2, 2024	128
Zadie assists Ellie on her EMT calls. The wombats use different shapes to make a sailboat-shaped birthday cake for Carly, Cece, and Clyde. Song (repeat from episode 13): "Set the Table" song by Ron Holsey, the wombats learn to set the table before their meal.
32	"Yo-Ho-Ho: A Sandwich for Mr. E"	Jeff Barker and Andrea Gerstmann	Cooper Sweeney	July 3, 2024	129
32	"Balloonie for Youie"	Jeff Barker and Andrea Gerstmann	Kai Grayson; Dean Outschoorn & Paul Moncrieffe (story by)	July 3, 2024	129
Mr. E buys a robot that hands out balloons. Song (repeat from episode 3): "The More I Try, The More I Know" song by Andrea Leon-Ramos, the wombats try out different scents for Super's bubble bath.
33	"Sammy Makes a Day"	Jeff Barker and Andrea Gerstmann	Darnell Lamont Walker	July 4, 2024	131
33	"Sammy's Primo"	Jeff Barker and Andrea Gerstmann	Michael Olmo	July 4, 2024	131
Sammy wants to surprise his mother with a day of fun, but it all goes downhill. But is fun still fun even if it's not really epic? Sammy speaks English, Benito speaks Spanish and Quique isn't around to translate. Thus, they are finding a way to communicate without words. Song (repeat from episode 11): "Same But Different" written by Randy Rogel, Zadie and Malik sing about similarities and differences.
34	"Backwards Day"	Jeff Barker and Andrea Gerstmann	Darnell Lamont Walker	July 5, 2024	132
34	"Patternpalooza"	Jeff Barker and Andrea Gerstmann	Deanna Oliver	July 5, 2024	132
On Backwards Day, The wombats do things the opposite way. A Patternpalooza is happening at the Treeborhood, with all sorts of games and prizes including a stuffed monster as the grand prize. Song (repeat from episode 10): "Pattern Song" written by Randy Rogel, Super sings about patterns.
TBA	"The Lakeview Hotel"	Jeff Barker and Andrea Gerstmann	Chuck Tately	2024	136
TBA	"Louisa's Home Movie"	Jeff Barker and Andrea Gerstmann	Sherri Stoner	2024	136
The Wombats visit an underwater hotel with popcorn and movies and a map that helps them navigate the hotel; Louisa, Duffy and Leiko discover the day when baby Louisa was adopted. Song (repeat from season 1 episode 16): "Don't Go Duffy and Leiko" song by Glen Berger, the wombats encourage Leiko and Duffy to keep trying, even if they fall. Note: This episode was never aired in the US and only aired in Canada on TVOKids (and possibly Knowledge Kids as well), plans to release the episode in Season 2 in the US have been shelved.
35	"The Treeborhood Cause and Effect Machine"	Jeff Barker and Andrea Gerstmann	Alyson Piekarsky	March 17, 2025	134
35	"Riddles of the Treeborhood"	Jeff Barker and Andrea Gerstmann	Sydney Isaacs	March 17, 2025	134
The Wombats are willing to watch their favorite game show and water a plant for the Shellys at the same time. Song (repeat from episode 12): "The Clean-Up Song" song by Ron Holsey, the wombats clean their room.
36	"The Great Splendito"	Jeff Barker and Andrea Gerstmann	Kathy Waugh	March 18, 2025	135
36	"The Bike Wash"	Jeff Barker and Andrea Gerstmann	Natalie Vazquez	March 18, 2025	135
Mr. E (as Mr. Splendito) has hidden five tickets to a special performance around the Treeborhood, and Malik and Sammy are trying to find the tickets. A storm has dirtied everyone's bike before the bike parade. It's up to the Wombats to create something to fix the mess. Song (repeat from episode 22): "Drip Drop" song by Andrea Leon-Ramos, It is raining outside so the wombats wait for a few days until the rain stops.
37	"Tricky Tricky Taiko Drum"	Jeff Barker and Andrea Gerstmann	Jiro C. Okada	March 19, 2025	137
37	"Toy Swap Flop"	Jeff Barker and Andrea Gerstmann	Cooper Sweeney	March 19, 2025	137
There are lots of sound patterns all over the Treeborhood, so many that Zeke keeps forgetting the drum pattern that he needs to remember. Zadie has a hard time admitting that she lost Louisa's toy blimp. If only she could remember to keep track of where she exactly had it! Song (repeat from episode 20): "The Day is Over, Night is On its Way" song by Kathy Waugh, the wombats sing a lullaby to the Treeborhood.
38	"Lost and Found Patrol"	Jeff Barker and Andrea Gerstmann	Deanna Oliver; Lalo Alcaraz (story by)	March 24, 2025	138
38	"Survey Says"	Jeff Barker and Andrea Gerstmann	Chuck Tately	March 24, 2025	138
When Super loses glasses, The Lost and Found Patrol are on the case to find them. Mr. E has a lot of ping-pong balls, which is both a good thing and a nuisance. The solution is to survey his customers. Song (repeat from episode 19): "It's Pancake Day" song by Ron Holsey, the wombats choose pancake toppings.
39	"Ellie's Island"	Jeff Barker and Andrea Gerstmann	Kathy Waugh; Tymika Tafari; Kathy Waugh; Kimberly Wright (story by)	March 25, 2025	139
39	"Zadie and Buckley's Playdate Problem"	Jeff Barker and Andrea Gerstmann	Natalie Vazquez	March 25, 2025	139
Ellie is excited to be going back to Jamaica. This makes the Wombats and Mr. E start to worry whether she will return. Buckley comes over for a playdate with Zadie. But when things usually go wrong, they also go right sometimes. Song (repeat from episode 21): "Don't Cry Little Fishes" song by Pierce Freelon, Ellie babysits the Fishmans' children.

=== Season 2 (2025–2026) ===
No.	Title	Directed by	Written by	Original release date	Prod. code
40	"The Big Loud Storm"	Jeff Barker and Andrea Gerstmann	Sherri Stoner	June 9, 2025	201
40	"Wish Monster"	Jeff Barker and Andrea Gerstmann	Kathy Waugh	June 9, 2025	201
Zeke gets nervous about a big storm; Zeke's dream of becoming a Wish Monster comes true
41	"Without Snout"	Jeff Barker and Andrea Gerstmann	Cooper Sweeney	June 10, 2025	202
41	"Remote Out of Control"	Jeff Barker and Andrea Gerstmann	Deanna Oliver	June 10, 2025	202
The wombats search for a missing remote control
42	"The Fishman's Big Date"	Jeff Barker and Andrea Gerstmann	Sherri Stoner	June 11, 2025	207
42	"Fishman Family Circus"	Jeff Barker and Andrea Gerstmann	Cusi Cram & Peter K. Hirsch	June 11, 2025	207
Fergus test-runs an official anniversary date for his wife, Felicia; The Fishmans want to put on an underwater circus show, The Wombats are there to help them find a way to do so.
43	"Flowerhood Photo Hunt"	Jeff Barker and Andrea Gerstmann	Chuck Tately	June 12, 2025	206
43	"A Stuffie Tea Party"	Jeff Barker and Andrea Gerstmann	Rachel Reuben	June 12, 2025	206
Sammy's mom, Yolanda sends the Treeborhood kids on a picture perfect scavenger hunt at the Flower Hood;
44	"Cake Day Surprise"	Jeff Barker and Andrea Gerstmann	Glen Berger & Peter Ferland	June 13, 2025	205
44	"A Treeborhood Vacation!"	Jeff Barker and Andrea Gerstmann	Elizabeth Gardner & Deanna Oliver	June 13, 2025	205
45	"Welcome to the Treeborhood"	Jeff Barker and Andrea Gerstmann	Darnell Lamont Walker	December 15, 2025	213
45	"Ice Cream Bike"	Jeff Barker and Andrea Gerstmann	Michael Olmo	December 15, 2025	213
A family of purple Haitian squirrels move into the Treeborhood. Devonte teaches the little wombats how to make ice cream for a hot day.
46	"Overbooked Super"	Jeff Barker and Andrea Gerstmann	Sherri Stoner	December 16, 2025	204
46	"Louisa's Big News"	Jeff Barker and Andrea Gerstmann	Kai Garyson	December 16, 2025	204
Super wants to attend three events, but she keeps getting interrupted by emergencies that need her help. Louisa wants to be the announcer of upcoming events, but she must figure a way for everybody in the Treeborhood to hear her.
47	"Zadie's Horrible Haircut"	Jeff Barker and Andrea Gerstmann	Sherri Stoner	December 17, 2025	210
47	"A Day Out with Babby"	Jeff Barker and Andrea Gerstmann	Jiro C. Okada	December 17, 2025	210
Zadie is afraid to have a barber cut her hair, and therefore tries to do it herself. When his siblings and Sammy are not available, Malik spends time with Babby, a small electronic speaker powered by artificial intelligence which he can ask some questions to. However, when Babby breaks down, Malik quickly learns the limitations of electronic devices.
48	"The Friendship Day Dance"	Jeff Barker and Andrea Gerstmann	Sherri Stoner	February 9, 2026	208
48	"The Friendship Day Light Show"	Jeff Barker and Andrea Gerstmann	Joon Chung	February 9, 2026	208
Zadie and JunJun teach Mr. E the tinikling for a dance party. The little wombats help their grandmother restore electricity to their home before the Friendship Day Light Show begins.
49	"Bex Splash Fest"	Andrea Gerstmann	Evan Thaler Hickey	April 3, 2026	219
49	"Mural Mayhem"	Andrea Gerstmann	Natalie Vazquez	April 3, 2026	219
A new raccoon named Bex has a hearing aid and a cochlear implant. Sammy and the Wombats find ways to communicate with her. The wombats try to paint a mural like Leiko.
50	"Toy Maker"	Jeff Barker and Andrea Gerstmann	Cooper Sweeney	May 25, 2026	209
50	"The Mysterious Ruckus"	Jeff Barker and Andrea Gerstmann	Michael Olmo	May 25, 2026	209
The Wombats make a toy maker to make Mr. E new toys. The Wombats track down a mysterious noise to hear Buzby's song.
51	"Great Uncle Duper's Super Visit"	Jeff Barker and Andrea Gerstmann	Mercedes Brazier-Thurman	May 26, 2026	212
51	"Claydate With Louisa"	Jeff Barker and Andrea Gerstmann	Deanna Oliver	May 26, 2026	212
The Wombats make a wind chime to help their great uncle sleep. Zeke tries to make Snout out of clay with Louisa.
52	"Bex & Sammy's New Groove"	Andrea Gerstmann	Evan Thaler Hickey	September 4, 2026	220
52	"Sticker Monster Dance Game"	Andrea Gerstmann	Angela Jorge	September 4, 2026	220
Bex and Sammy have a sleepover at Yolanda's house and they pick the best routine. Zadie makes everyone mad when she invents a new dancing game but won't let anyone else be in charge. Then, she learns to share it so people can be in charge.
53	"Diwali in the Treeborhood"	Andrea Gerstmann	Pam Sawhney & Kathy Waugh	November 2, 2026	214
53	"Sandcastle Success"	Andrea Gerstmann	Natalie Vazquez	November 2, 2026	214
54	"Hanukkah and the Snowy Day"	TBA	N/A	November 23, 2026	215
54	"The Fishman's Menorah"	TBA	N/A	November 23, 2026	215

== Related media ==
=== Games ===
These games were released on the PBS Kids website, as well as the PBS Kids Games App.

1. Step It Out!
2. Road Repair
3. Story Emporium
4. Toy Maker
5. Pattern Palooza Fair!
6. Treeborhood Party Quest

== Development ==
The themes and ideas of the show were previously covered in Aha Island, a WGBH multimedia project about monkeys who use computational thinking.

Some elements from Aha Island were recycled for Work It Out Wombats!, such as the existence of the Everything Emporium.

The series was greenlit in October 2020, under the working title of Wombats! Wombats were chosen as the species of the main characters because they are underused in media.

Early-career writers were granted fellowships so they could bring diverse viewpoints and BIPOC representation to the series.

The production team worked to ensure authentic representations of names, language, and some of the cultural origins found with the animals themselves, while keeping in mind that animals are not a proxy for race and ethnicity.

For example, JunJun and his family are Philippine eagles, while Ellie is a moose; an animal not found in Jamaica.

=== Casting ===
The producers deliberately sought out voice actors that match the ethnicity of the characters to ensure authenticity. Rain Janjua, the voice of Zeke, originally auditioned for the role of Malik for being asked to try out for Zeke. To create the voice, Janjua tried to recall how his voice sounded between four and five years old.

=== Animation ===
The characters are animated using complicated rigging systems that allow the animators to draw things by hand, thus giving each character their own nuances and walk cycles. The designs of the characters and settings are rounded in order to create a friendly, welcoming feel. Curvilinear perspective and hazing is used for the backgrounds to make the characters stand out.

== Reception ==
=== Audience viewership ===
Work It Out Wombats! achieved 23 million streams on PBS Kids video platforms within its first two weeks, as well as over 1.7 million views on YouTube.

=== Critical response ===
The series was praised for its positive messages, educational value, and high-energy characters. Writing for Common Sense Media, Diondra Brown rated it 5/5 stars, saying "The show's quality matches -- actually, exceeds, the high expectations viewers have for PBS Kids programming."

=== Controversy ===
The lesbian characters of Leiko and Duffy caused the series to be controversial among some parents. In May 2023, the Governor of Oklahoma, Kevin Stitt, vetoed a measure to provide state funding to Oklahoma Educational Television Authority for three years, due to their broadcasting of Work It Out Wombats! (and of Clifford the Big Red Dog, which also features same-sex parents) and the claims that it "overly sexualizes our kids."

=== Accolades ===
Year	Award	Category	Nominee	Result	Ref.
2024	GLAAD Media Awards	Outstanding Children's Programming	Work It Out Wombats!	Nominated	

== Marketing ==
To promote the series, a walkaround mascot of Zeke traveled to different places in the Boston area from February 22 to February 24, under the title "Zeke's Big Boston Adventure." Zeke went to the Boston Children's Museum, the Franklin Park Zoo, and the Boston Public Library. The Mayor of Boston, Michelle Wu, declared February 21 as "Work It Out Wombats! Day."

== See also ==
- List of programs broadcast by PBS Kids
