= Karma's World =

Animated streaming television series

- Genre: Coming-of-age; Musical; Comedy
- Created by: Chris Bridges
- Based on: The Karma's World educational website created by Ludacris
- Developed by: Wendy Harris; Rachel Kalban; Jennie Stacey
- Directed by: Boronagh O'Hanlon; Pete McEvoy
- Voices of: Asiahn Bryant; Chris Bridges; Camden Coley; Ramone Hamilton; Isaia Alvarez Kohn; Aria Capria; Dascha Polanco; Tiffany Haddish; Danielle Brooks
- Opening theme: "Welcome to Karma's World"
- Ending theme: "Welcome to Karma's World" (instrumental)
- Composers: Marcus Meston; Matt Mahaffey; Chris Bridges
- Countries of origin: Canada; Ireland; Indonesia; United States
- Original language: English
- No. of seasons: 4
- No. of episodes: 40

Production
- Executive producers: Chris Bridges; Vince Commisso; Cathal Gaffney; Wendy Harris; Darragh O'Connell; Angela C. Santomero; Jennie Stacey
- Producers: Lorraine Morgan (S1); Lisa O'Connor; Hannah Cope (S4)
- Running time: 13 minutes
- Production companies: Netflix Animation Studios; Karma's World Entertainment; Brown Bag Films; 9 Story Media Group

Original release
- Network: Netflix
- Release: October 15, 2021 – September 22, 2022

Karma's World is an animated musical comedy television series created by Chris Bridges and developed by Wendy Harris, Rachel Kalban, and Jennie Stacey for Netflix. It was released on October 15, 2021.

Produced by 9 Story Media Group in Canada and Brown Bag Films in Ireland, and animated by its Bali studio subsidiary, the series is loosely based on an educational website of the same name which was created in 2009 by Karma’s World Entertainment, a consortium created by Ludacris specifically for his eldest daughter, Karma Bridges, whose name and inspiration he cited in interviews as the core reason behind his creation of the series. Netflix renewed Karma's World for a second season, which was released on March 10, 2022. Season 3 was released on July 7, 2022. The fourth and final season was released on September 22, 2022.

== Premise ==
The series follows the story of Karma Grant, a young girl who begins middle school and learns that through her music she can stay "true to herself" instead of letting challenges push her down.

== Characters ==
=== Main ===
- Karma Grant (Asiahn): The series' main 11-year-old female protagonist. She is an aspiring rapper who is beginning to realize the power that music and words can have, and believes that she can share her music and even change the world.
- Conrad Grant (Ludacris): The father of Karma who inspires her when she is down, and even raps on stage with her. He is a music teacher.
- Keys Grant (Camden Coley): The younger brother of Karma. He is an inventor, but his gadgets do not work well on the first try.
- Crash Watkins (Ramone Hamilton): Karma's classmate and also her frenemy. He and Karma might not get along everyday, but they still have a lot in common.
- Alex "Switch" Stein (vocals by Aria Capria and beat-box vocals by Kaila Mullady): The female best friend of Karma and Winston who is thoughtful and friendly. She is a gifted violinist and beatboxer.
- Winston Torres (Isaia Alvarez Kohn): The male best friend of Karma and Switch. He is a sneaker designer, an artist, and a videographer.
- Ms. Camilla Torres (Dascha Polanco): The mother of Winston. She owns a record shop.
- Lady K (Tiffany Haddish): The head of a recording studio where Karma began working.
- Lillie Carter-Grant (Danielle Brooks): The mother of Karma advises her daughter and lets her know about hair styles of their black women ancestors. She is a doctor.

=== Supporting ===
- Anjali Aria Agneshwar: Karma's biggest fan club founder Neha
- Megan Zhang (Olivia Chun): Karma's friend who goes to one of her sleepovers.
- Sabiya Abdullah (Swayam Bhatia): Another of Karma's friends who comes to a sleepover.
- MC Grillz (Jordan Fisher): A famous rapper who is the host of "Freestyle Knockout", a popular rapping competition, and is a dentist.
- Ms. Jackie Washington (Dawnn Lewis): The Neighborhood Council President of Hansberry Heights. Her nickname is Ms. Dubs.
- Chris Douglas (Ares Totolos): Crash's best friend.
- Chef Scott Crowley (Marc Thompson): The owner of the Duet Diner. Karma, Winston, Switch, and Keys are his favorite customers. His diner's most popular item is purple scones.
- Mr. Mervin Crawford (Dean Irby): The neighborhood grump. He loves playing chess.
- Mr. Rishi Singal (Karan Soni): Karma, Winston, and Switch's middle school teacher.
- Doña Maria Torres (Ivonne Coll): Camilla's mother and Winston's grandmother. She is in a wheelchair due to having a stroke.
- Cece Dupree (Keke Palmer): A conniving and rude rapper who does whatever she can to achieve her goals, even if other people are pulled down in the process.

== Episodes ==
=== Series overview ===
Season	Episodes	Originally released
1	15	October 15, 2021
2	8	March 10, 2022
3	9	July 7, 2022
4	8	September 22, 2022

=== Season 1 (2021) ===
No. overall	No. in season	Title	Directed by	Written by	Release date
1	1	"I Am Karma"	Bronagh O'Hanlon	Kellie R. Griffin	October 15, 2021
Karma starts her first day at Peachtree Middle School. While there she meets someone who loves music as much as her and someone who mocks her name. This episode originally premiered on October 4, 2021 on YouTube.
2	2	"Daddy Daughter Day"	Bronagh O'Hanlon	Halcyon Person	October 15, 2021
Karma is conflicted on whether to go to the concert of a well-known rapper or go an activity with her father that she now feels she is too old for.
3	3	"Hair Comes Trouble"	Bronagh O'Hanlon & Pete McEvoy	Kellie R. Griffin & Halcyon Person	October 15, 2021
After she has a sleepover with her classmates, Karma thinks she should change her hair. Her mom tells her that she should love her curly natural hair instead.
4	4	"Major Disaster"	Bronagh O'Hanlon	Keion Jackson	October 15, 2021
The dog of Keys and Karma goes missing in the park. She rallies the neighbors to find her dog.
5	5	"This Is for My Girls"	Bronagh O'Hanlon	Alyson Piekarsky	October 15, 2021
When a classmate says something harsh to Karma, she begins to have doubts before she is about to show off her rap skills.
6	6	"Best Friends for Never"	Bronagh O'Hanlon	Keion Jackson	October 15, 2021
Karma realizes that she hasn't been as nice to Winston as she could have been. Winston, on the other hand, thinks that someone else is replacing him as her friend.
7	7	"Lost for Words"	Bronagh O'Hanlon & Pete McEvoy	Keion Jackson	October 15, 2021
Karma decides to face a person who swiped her journal and fight them in a rap battle.
8	8	"Karma's Writer's Block"	Bronagh O'Hanlon & Pete McEvoy	Keion Jackson	October 15, 2021
Karma is overworked and stressed. She begins getting writer's block after making a promise to Switch.
9	9	"Do the Write Thing"	Bronagh O'Hanlon	Keion Jackson	October 15, 2021
Karma thinks she is a failure after the announcement of the winner of the Kids' Poetry Slam Jam winner. She changes her mind when Keys helps her learn a lesson.
10	10	"Switch's Secret"	Bronagh O'Hanlon & Pete McEvoy	Keion Jackson	October 15, 2021
Switch's secret skill is found out by her friends as she has trouble with admitting to her parents her true feelings about a performance she will have soon.
11	11	"The Hippity Hop"	Bronagh O'Hanlon & Pete McEvoy	Keion Jackson	October 15, 2021
Before the talent showcase at her school begins, they name Karma the hip hop captain. However, she worries what others will think of those she chose for her team.
12	12	"Freestyle Knockout"	Bronagh O'Hanlon	Keion Jackson	October 15, 2021
Karma is invited onto a popular show to compete with others in freestyle rap, she forms a team with he friend Crash. However, in order to win she begins copying what the other teams are doing.
13	13	"The Legend of Lost Lyrics, Part 1"	Bronagh O'Hanlon & Pete McEvoy	Keion Jackson	October 15, 2021
In order to make sure local record shop doesn't close, Karma and her friends attempt to find a hidden treasure.
14	14	"The Legend of Lost Lyrics, Part 2"	Bronagh O'Hanlon & Pete McEvoy	Keion Jackson	October 15, 2021
Karma and her friends continue their search. In the process, Karma runs into someone familiar.
15	15	"Final Showdown"	Bronagh O'Hanlon	Keion Jackson	October 15, 2021
Karma and Crash are working together, but begin competing in a freestyle battle. Karma tries to make sure the local record shop is not threatened.

=== Season 2 (2022) ===
No. overall	No. in season	Title	Written by	Release date
16	1	"Karma Goes to Work"	Keion Jackson & Charity L. Miller	March 10, 2022
Karma begins working at a recording studio run by Lady K. However, when she sees rap challenges posted by Tayla and Jayla, it distracts her from her work there.
17	2	"We Dance Full Out"	Keion Jackson & Charity L. Miller	March 10, 2022
Following a dance audition, Carrie hurts Switch with negative comments, so Switch joins Karma and both work together to challenge a team led by Carrie in a music battle.
18	3	"Love What You Love"	Keion Jackson & Charity L. Miller	March 10, 2022
Following her friend's comments, Karma hides that she likes a singer they mock until she meets someone who tells her to not hold back in what she loves.
19	4	"Home Sweet Scone"	Keion Jackson & Charity L. Miller	March 10, 2022
Rude new people come to the town after scones by Chef Scott are featured in the local paper. Karma and her friends attempt to teach these newcomers to be respectful.
20	5	"Winston's Worries"	Keion Jackson, Charity L. Miller & Alyson Piekarsky	March 10, 2022
Winston wants to be at the birthday of his grandmother no matter what but gets held back when trying to film another video. Karma tries to help him.
21	6	"Rhyme O'Clock News"	Keion Jackson & Charity L. Miller	March 10, 2022
Karma, with her friends Winston and Switch, create a hip hop news report about their local neighborhood. When topics to report on dry up, Karma does whatever she can for it to continue, even if it means fabricating stories.
22	7	"Karma for President"	Keion Jackson & Charity L. Miller	March 10, 2022
Karma begins running to be student president of Peachtree Middle School. When she begins saying "yes" to a lot of people, she starts to be overwhelmed.
23	8	"Let the Good Times Grow"	Keion Jackson & Charity L. Miller	March 10, 2022
When the local department store puts the local community garden under threat, Karma works with her mom to save the garden.

=== Season 3 (2022) ===
No. overall	No. in season	Title	Written by	Release date
24	1	"Fancy Footwork"	Keion Jackson & Charity L. Miller	July 7, 2022
To pay for new Sky Rockets sneakers, Karma and Winston do jobs around the neighborhood. But all their hard work only brings in enough for one pair.
25	2	"Sneakerheads"	Keion Jackson & Charity L. Miller	July 7, 2022
When Karma, Winston and Switch paint portraits for an art assignment, Winston tries something different — and Karma learns to open her mind.
26	3	"Schoolyard Showdown"	Keion Jackson & Charity L. Miller	July 7, 2022
A playground mix-up leads to anger and lots of big feelings. Can Karma and Crash team up to stop Winston and Christopher from fighting?
27	4	"The Go Girls"	Keion Jackson & Charity L. Miller	July 7, 2022
When Karma forms a girl group, a new member soaks up the spotlight, causing Karma to feel jealous and alone. But Karma learns how to share the shine.
28	5	"School Spies"	Keion Jackson & Charity L. Miller	July 7, 2022
Carrie and Karma start their own clubs and set out to prove who's the best — until Karma discovers a big secret. Should she keep it to herself or share it?
29	6	"Abuelita's Protest"	Keion Jackson & Charity L. Miller	July 7, 2022
After Doña Maria is treated unfairly at the neighborhood Story Slam, Winston and Karma start a protest but learn there are other ways to make change.
30	7	"Friendship in a Flash"	Darnell Lamont Walker	July 7, 2022
A class project pairs Karma with a cool new friend named Sam, who has dyslexia. Karma tries to do everything — until she learns there are ways to work together!
31	8	"Moms On Strike"	Keion Jackson & Charity L. Miller	July 7, 2022
When the kids say no to chores, their moms go on strike. Now Karma and Keys have to do things for themselves and show their mom they appreciate her.
32	9	"Brotherly Love"	Keion Jackson & Charity L. Miller	July 7, 2022
While trying to write a song for open mic night, Karma gets annoyed by Keys' antics. But something unexpected forces the two to bond and work together.

=== Season 4 (2022) ===
No. overall	No. in season	Title	Written by	Original release date
33	1	"Karma's Biggest Fan"	Keion Jackson & Charity L. Miller	September 22, 2022
Karma meets her superfan, Neha, who's eager to interview her. But when an annoyed Karma blows Neha off, she realizes the power of being a role model.
34	2	"Keys, the Inventor"	Keion Jackson & Charity L. Miller	September 22, 2022
When Keys heads to the Invention Expo to show off his creations, a man's cruel words upset him. So his family shows him he can be anything he wants to be!
35	3	"The Big Stink"	Keion Jackson & Charity L. Miller	September 22, 2022
The Community Center is buzzing with activity — until a smell has everyone running away! Can Karma convince the neighborhood to help her get rid of it?
36	4	"Switch That Beat"	Keion Jackson & Charity L. Miller	September 22, 2022
When Switch buys a beat maker, Karma is excited to make new songs with her but forgets to show Switch how much she appreciates her.
37	5	"Family Feud"	Keion Jackson & Charity L. Miller	September 22, 2022
After talking to Switch, Karma notices her parents arguing and fears her family might be falling apart. But she tries to keep her worries to herself.
38	6	"Save the Center, Part 1"	Keion Jackson & Charity L. Miller	September 22, 2022
With the center in need of repairs, a music star steps in with big plans to save it — and record a song with Karma. Are her promises too good to be true?
39	7	"Save the Center, Part 2"	Keion Jackson & Charity L. Miller	September 22, 2022
The neighborhood can't wait for the Supersound Skyscraper! But Karma worries that confronting CeCe about her song will ruin everything.
40	8	"Save the Center, Part 3"	Keion Jackson & Charity L. Miller	September 22, 2022
While CeCe works to sabotage the Hansberry Heights fundraiser to save the center, Karma realizes there are other ways to keep community spirit alive.

== Production ==
The series is produced by the Bali studio subsidiary of Brown Bag Films and Creative Affairs Group, both subsidiaries of 9 Story Media Group, and Karma's World Entertainment, Ludacris' consortium/production company. Apart from Ludacris, Vince Commisso, Cathal Gaffney, Wendy Harris, Darragh O'Connell, Angela C. Santomero, Jennie Stacey are also executive producers for the series, while Danielle Gillis, Lorraine Morgan, and Lisa O'Connor are producers. They are joined by Bronagh O'Hanlon as the show director and Elaine A. Lugo Herrera as art director. Additionally, the show's head writer is Halcyon Person. On October 13, 2020, Netflix announced the green-lighting of the series with a 40-episode order, each of which would be 11 minutes long. The series was targeted at children who are 6–9 years old. Ludacris also claimed that the show would "move hip hop culture forward" by showing young girls they can change the world with the tools at their disposal. On June 14, 2021, a sneak peek of the series was shown at the Annecy International Animation Film Festival. At the festival, Ludacris said he hoped that the show would be something that has a "a long-lasting impression" on children. Person, on the same panel, argued that the show, set in a fictional neighborhood of Brooklyn, New York, said that the series includes a diversity of "hair texture and diversity of skin tones" in order to make sure all kinds of characters are celebrated, and argued that the series "models great behavior" for children.

The official trailer for the series was released on September 23, 2021, and the show's first episode premiered on YouTube on October 4. The entirety of the show's first season premiered worldwide on Netflix on 15 October 2021. Before the show's premiere, Ludacris said that the show was inspired by his eldest daughter, Karma. He also said that he tried to "make every single character unique" and hoped that his daughter would be able to guest star on the show in the future. He additionally said that featuring positive role models and different ethnicities was something he took from the Fast & Furious franchise. On November 5, 2021, Ludacris told Billboard that the show had been "close to 14 years in the making" and hoped that would be a show for everyone, kids and adults. He said that he believed the series would change "young people’s lives for the better." On November 8, 2021, Person told Essence about how with Karma they tried to celebrate her hairstyle and everyone's, working "really hard to try and get right" in order to have "authentic storytelling." She also noted that she and writers she worked with collaborated to address microaggressions, working with an organization named the Perception Institute, which analyzes people's perceptions as they're watching media. She also praised Netflix for giving them the opportunity to tell these stories about Black culture. The whole second season premiered on Netflix on March 10, 2022, the third season on July 7, 2022, and the fourth and final season on September 22, 2022. In December 2022, Darnell Lamont Walker, writer for the Season 3 episode "Friendship In a Flash", was interviewed by BET, said that working on the series was "incredible", that it was his "first real job as a children’s writer", and noted that episodes like the one he wrote were "important", especially for those with dyslexia. Walker had joined the show's writing team in 2019, and later said that the episode aired over two years after he wrote it. He was later nominated, along with the show's writing team, for Outstanding Writing for an Animated Program at the 1st Children's and Family Emmy Awards.

== Music ==
The show's original music and sound design are supervised and created by Ludacris and James Bennett Jr., while Gerald Keys is a producer. Songs tackle issues such as discrimination, body positivity, self-esteem, friendship, family, and differences. The show's theme song, "Welcome to Karma’s World", is sung by Asiahn, the voice actress for Karma. On September 14, 2021, Ludacris unveiled the show's soundtrack, which was released by Universal Music Group through its Def Jam label on the same date as the show's Netflix premiere.

== Merchandise ==
=== Books ===
In March 2021, 9 Story Media Group and Karma's World Entertainment started a deal with Scholastic Corporation, with the books planned to be released between January and March 2022 to accompany the Netflix series. All three books were co-written by Person. In an October 2021 interview, Ludacris noted that a Karma's World entitled Daddy and Me and the Rhyme to Be was coming out. Apart from the aforementioned book, currently the juvenile fiction books The Great Shine-A-Thon Showcase, and Viral Video Showdown, and journal Karma's World Creativity Journal: Freestyling With Friends are listed on the Scholastic website.

=== Toys ===
In April 2021, 9 Story and Karma's World Entertainment signed a deal with Mattel to develop a toy line for the franchise, including dolls, "doll accessories," and other elements. In March 2022, it was announced that the dolls would be released in the summer of 2022.

=== Clothing ===
In February 2022, FIT's Design and Technology Lab (DTech) announced a deal with Karma's World Entertainment and 9 Story to create a 50-piece fashion set for children which was inspired by the series, including dresses, jackets, and footwear. 9 Story called it a "unique partnership." Essence called it a "fashion-forward" collection, while one of the designers, Hawwaa Ibrahim, said they were grateful for the opportunity to apply their skills.

=== Other merchandise ===
9 Story and Karma's World Entertainment have announced planned expansions of the franchise beyond books, toys, and clothing. In November 2021, 9 Story noted that the franchise would be expanded to bags, backpacks, consumer electronics, skateboards, and other materials.

== Reception ==
The series has been received positively. Joly Herman of Common Sense Media described the series as "top-shelf", saying that it has "creative, fully fleshed-out characters" and has the characters artfully face "heartfelt, complex issues." Herman also argued that the series is "full of empowering moments" and said that it uses art to "inspire, empower, and elevate through storytelling," calling it an excellent series for "young tweens." Claretta Bellamy of NBC News stated that the show's second season tackles challenges such as personal space and body shaming in a way that "both entertains and allows for kids to comprehend."

Lynnette Nicholas of Parents listed the series among seven other kids series that "celebrate Black history and culture," stating that it centers "Black family joy, creativity, confidence, and Black girlhood", describing the series writing by Halcyon Person as "genuine and authentic", and pointed to the series highlight hip hop, with episodes focusing on pride in a person's identity, community, friendship, and personal courage. Bethonie Butler of Washington Post noted that the series is steeped "in curriculum as they are in hip-hop culture", pointed to the episode "Hair Comes Trouble" focusing on microaggressions related to the hair of the main character, Karma, and said that the series joins The Proud Family, Doc McStuffins, Ada Twist, Scientist, and Hair Love in "increasing representation in children's animation."

D'Shonda Brown of Essence also focused on the same episode as Butler, noting that in the episode Karma's friends question her about her hair bonnet and touch her hair, and saying that in the series, Karma navigates through life as a "young Black girl while facing relevant topics such as friendship, bullying, and school". Animation World Network noted how the series focuses on "racial profiling, body shaming, and microaggression among best friends."

Karma Bridges, who the character Karma was based on, later told WSB Radio that she had seen the show's impact on people, with viewers confiding to her that their daughters loved the show, and that she saw "little girls dressing up as Karma for Halloween.". In the Internet, people think that Karma's rapping is embarrassing.

=== Awards and nominations ===
Year	Award	Category	Nominee	Result	Ref.
2021	53rd NAACP Image Awards	Outstanding Children's Program	Karma's World	Nominated	
2021	53rd NAACP Image Awards	Outstanding Character Voice-Over Performance (Television)	Ludacris – Karma's World	Nominated	
2021	53rd NAACP Image Awards	Outstanding Breakthrough Creative (Television)	Halcyon Person – Karma's World	Nominated	
2022	1st Children's and Family Emmy Awards	Outstanding Writing for an Animated Program	Karma's World	Nominated	
