= Hardo =

American rapper (born 1992)

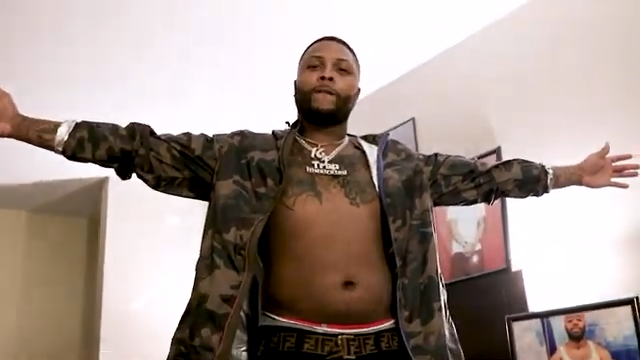
- Barnett in 2020

Background information
- Also known as: Trapnhardo
- Born: Joseph Barnett Jr. May 6, 1992 (age 34); Wilkinsburg, Pennsylvania, U.S.
- Origin: Pittsburgh, Pennsylvania, U.S.
- Genre: Hip-hop
- Years active: 2011–present
- Labels: SinceThe80s; RED Music; Grand Hustle; REMember

Joseph Barnett Jr. (born May 6, 1992), known professionally as Hardo, is an American rapper. He is best known for his collaborations with other Pittsburgh-based rappers such as Jimmy Wopo, Mac Miller, and Wiz Khalifa.

== Early life ==
Barnett was born on May 6, 1992, in Wilkinsburg, Pennsylvania. Barnett attended Taylor Allderdice High School, where he became friends with rapper and future collaborator, Mac Miller.

== Career ==
In 2009, Barnett started making music with his classmate, Mac Miller. In 2011, he released his breakout song "Cut Throat".

After being released from jail in 2014, Barnett released the single "Trapnati", which would be the title song for his mixtape. In November 2015, he released the EP "Drug Related", which had features from Shy Glizzy, Trae tha Truth, and Jimmy Wopo, as well as production from Metro Boomin, Sonny Digital, and more.

In March 2016, Barnett released the single "Blasphemy", which rapper 21 Savage was featured on. In late 2016, he released a collaborative mixtape with Jimmy Wopo, with features from 21 Savage and Wiz Khalifa. In late-2016, he released the single "Today's a Good Day", featuring Wiz Khalifa and Jimmy Wopo.

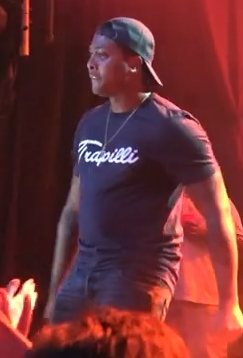
Hardo performing

In mid-2017, Barnett signed a deal with RED Music, an imprint of Sony Music, which Barnett claimed that Sony noticed him after releasing "Today's a Good Day". In October 2017, he joined Detroit rapper Tee Grizzley on his "Ain't It A Blessing Tour", later in November 2017, he performed the opener for Tee Grizzley's concert, along with Lil Yachty, Lud Foe, and Sada Baby.

In April 2018, Barnett released the single "Smile", which featured vocals from Latia. In 2018, Barnett and Jimmy Wopo were featured on Wiz Khalifa's song "Blue Hunnids", which was featured on Khalifa's album Rolling Papers 2.

== Personal life ==
=== Legal issues ===
In 2009, Barnett was arrested for the first time, in New Kensington, Pennsylvania, on charges of home invasion. In 2010, he was arrested for possession of heroin, and was sentenced to probation. In March 2010, he was arrested once again for possession of heroin with the intent to distribute.

In August 2013, Barnett was pulled over for failing to stop at a stop sign, when police would found 250 stamp-bags containing heroin, leading to Barnett making an attempt to flee, however he was tackled by an officer, he was arrested and charged with heroin possession with the intent to distribute, resisting arrest, and attempt to flee from a crime scene. He was sent the Allegheny County Jail, and his bond was set at $25,000.

== Discography ==
- Fame or Feds: Rap or Bricks (2012) (with Deezlee)
- Trapnati (2015)
- Drug Related (2015)
- Trapn Fever (2016)
- Trapnese (2016) (with Jimmy Wopo)
- Trapway (2017) (with Kizzl)
- The Fame or Feds Story (2018)
- Days Inn (2020)
- Trapn Fever 2 (2020)
- Fame or Feds 3 (2021) (with DJ Drama & Deezlee)
- Top 10 Trappers DOA (2022)
- Trapnati 3 (2024)
- Some Gifts Are Priceless (2024)
- 81600 (2025) (with Heemi)
- 1600 Degrees (2025)
- Some Gifts Are Priceless 2 (2026)
