= Darnell Lamont Walker =

American writer, death doula, director and producer (born 1982)

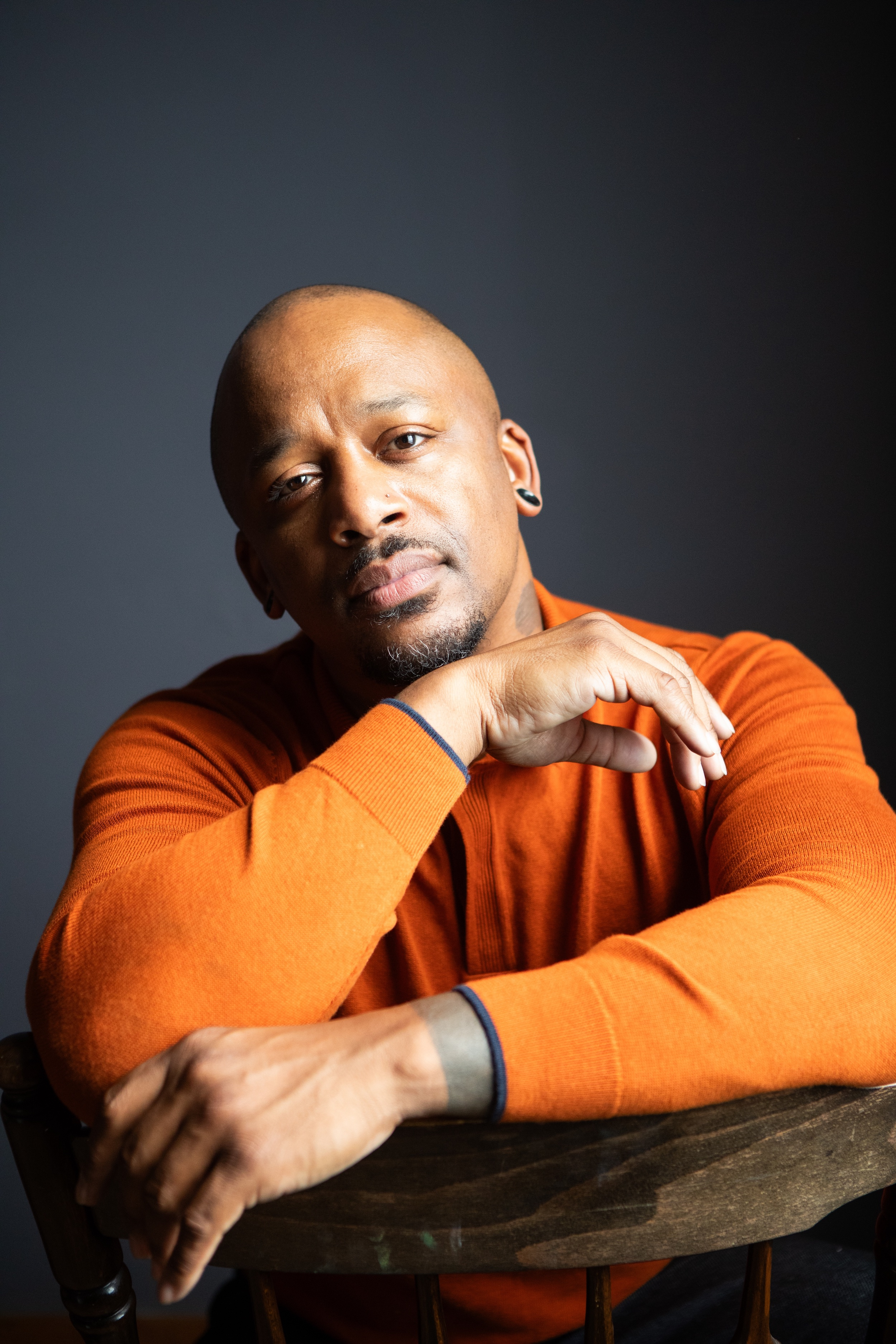
- Darnell Lamont Walker by Kristen Finn
- Born: February 17, 1982 (age 44); Charlottesville, Virginia, U.S.
- Education: Bethune-Cookman University; Howard University
- Occupations: Writer, director, producer
- Years active: 2013–present
- Organization(s): Kappa Alpha Psi; Children's Media Association Academy of Television Arts & Sciences
- Known for: Mental health advocacy; death doula work; political activism; environmental activism
- Notable work: Never Can Say Goodbye: The Life of a Death Doula and the Art of a Peaceful End (2026, HarperOne); Our Song: Animated Short (2026, Ace Animation)
- Height: 6 ft 1 in (185 cm)
- Children: 1
- Website: darnellwalker.com

Darnell Lamont Walker (born February 17, 1982) is an American writer, director, producer, and death doula. He directed and produced social impact documentaries, including Seeking Asylum, Outside the House, and Set Yourself on Fire, which have screened at various film festivals. He has written for children's television shows Karma's World, Face's Music Party, and Blue's Clues & You!. He was part of the Karma's World writing team that received an Emmy nomination for Outstanding Writing for an Animated Program at the 1st Children's and Family Emmy Awards. Walker is also the author of Never Can Say Goodbye: The Life of a Death Doula and the Art of a Peaceful End, exploring grief, mortality, living fully, and end-of-life care.

== Early life and education ==
Walker was born and raised in Charlottesville, Virginia. He attended Charlottesville High School He credits his theater teacher Terésa Dowell-Vest, for his love of theater and performance, and his strength in writing.

Walker attended Bethune–Cookman University. He first majored in Mass Communications, then switched to Speech Communication. In an interview, Walker said that he was inspired to attend an HBCU and likened his experience to that of the television spinoff A Different World. He is a member of the Kappa Alpha Psi fraternity. He got his Bachelor of Arts in 2005, and a Master of Science in 2007.

He went to Howard University where he got his PhD in Communication and Culture in 2011.

== Career ==
=== Documentaries ===
In 2015, Walker had been planning to go backpacking in Europe to celebrate King's Day in Amsterdam, when events concerning the killing of Freddie Gray in nearby Baltimore happened. As he was reconsidering to stay and join in protests, his friend asked "why are you going to Europe? To seek asylum?", inspiring him to repurpose his trip to produce a documentary with the namesake. The film would have man-on-the-street interviews with European locals on what they thought about race relations in the United States and in their own countries. Countries visited included Norway, UK, Netherlands, and France. Seeking Asylum had a theater premiere in February 2016 for the Pan African Film Festival. It screened at the Rapid Lion Film Festival in Johannesburg, South Africa, and the Virginia Film Festival in Charlottesville. It has also screened at other film festivals, and was released online to support the Black Lives Matter movement.

In 2017, Walker released Outside the House, a documentary film on Black mental health. He decided to create the film after a college friend had committed suicide, and when some other friends and associates had over the years. In the film, Walker works to "breaking down the barriers and stigmas when it comes to black people discussing their mental-health issues, and confronting the problem head-on". He used social media to call for participants, and would interview them for their stories. Outside the House was screened at multiple film festivals including the Roxbury Film Festival in Boston, as well as special events in places like the DuSable Museum of African American History in Chicago. It received an Award of Merit from IndieFEST.

In 2018, Walker completed the film Set Yourself on Fire. The documentary is about rape and sexual assault around the world, with interviews with the survivors. Set Yourself on Fire was screened at the Rapid Lion Film Festival. and for the Metro Detroit Association of Black Psychologists.

=== Children's television and media ===
Walker had self-published a children's book titled The Most Beautiful Thing in the World, about a boy who dreams of becoming a pilot, but learns he will be losing his sight. He also wrote I Hate That I Have to Tell You (2016), which is about how to deal with encounters with the police. In 2018, Walker applied to and joined the Sesame Street Writers Room Fellowship.

Walker joined the Karma's World writing team, writing his first episode in 2019. He wrote the episode "Friendship in a Flash" about Karma making a new friend with dyslexia and her misinformation about the learning disability. He said that the episode aired over two years after he wrote it. In December 2022, he and the show's writing team received a nomination for Outstanding Writing for an Animated Program at the 1st Children's and Family Emmy Awards.

Also in 2019, Walker joined the Blue's Clues & You! writing team as a script coordinator.

In 2021, he announced he would be creating an animated short film, Our Song, which is about a boy with ectrodactyly (missing fingers and toes), who wants to play the piano. It is based on a friend's son with the same condition. The project is seeking crowdfunding.

Walker did the teleplay for episodes of Face's Music Party, which aired on the Nick Jr. Channel.

=== Playwright ===
Walker’s work has been featured Off-Broadway, including a monologue written for a production about Harlem crime boss Ellsworth “Bumpy” Johnson, produced by the Classical Theatre of Harlem. The monologue contributed to Walker’s growing reputation for crafting deeply human characters grounded in historical and cultural truth.

=== Other ventures ===
Walker has also worked as a "death doula, writing teacher, creativity coach, and world explorer". This included being a faculty member at the Esalen Institute. In 2015, he started a business called Passport Required, in which he guides travelers from the Black community on a backpacking tour to random parts of the world. Walker directed [[August Wilson]]'s King Hedley II for the Charlottesville Player's Guild.

He created a narrative installation which resembled a darkroom for Art Gaysel 2022.

== Personal life ==
Walker lives "between his cabin on top of Blood Mountain in the Chattahoochee National Forest and the rest of the open world,"

Walker has one son.

In December 2022, after attending the Emmys event, Walker was prevented from boarding a Delta Air Lines flight at LAX allegedly because he was Black, while the gate attendant allowed other White passengers to continue through. He filed a complaint and Tweeted about the incident, which was worldwide news. There has been nothing presented to substantiate this claim.

== Books ==
- Creep (Evolutionary Press, 2011)
- Book of She (Lulu, 2012) ISBN 9781300567943 (e-book)
- The Most Beautiful Thing in the World (Evolutionary Press, 2014) ISBN 9780692260517
- Very short notes I wrote to you while I was high on cocaine (2015)
- I Hate That I Have to Tell You (Evolutionary Press, 2016)
- Never Can Say Goodbye: The Life of a Death Doula and the Art of a Peaceful End (HarperOne, 2026)

== Filmography ==
=== Film ===
List of production work in films
Year	Title	Crew role	Notes	Source
2016	Seeking Asylum	Producer, Director		
2017	Outside the House	Producer, Director, Editor		
2019	Set Yourself on Fire	Director, Executive Producer		
TBA	Our Song	Writer, creator	animated short film	

=== Television ===
List of production work in television
Year	Title	Crew role	Notes	Source	
2021–2024	Blue's Clues & You!	Script Coordinator, Writer	Season 3–4	Credits	
2021–2024	2022	Face's Music Party	Writer	Episodes: "Help", "Food", "Big Cats"	Credits
Karma's World	2022	Writer	Episode: "Friendship in a Flash"		
2023	Work It Out Wombats!	Writer	Episodes: "Brother Day", "Zeke's Collection Selection", "Color Fun", "Sammy Makes a Day", "Backwards Day", "Welcome to the Treeborhood"	Credits	
2023	Rubble & Crew	Writer	Episodes: "The Crew Builds a Drive-In Movie Theater", "The Crew Builds a Giant Dam"	Credits	
2025	Lyla in the Loop	Writer	Episodes: "Crack You Up"	Credits	

=== Web series ===
List of acting appearances in web series
Year	Title	Role	Notes	Source
2010–2012	Anacostia	Julian	Starring role, seasons 2–3	Credits
