= Empire: Original Soundtrack Season 2 Volume 2 =

Soundtrack album by Various artists
- Released: April 29, 2016
- Genres: Hip hop; R&B; pop
- Label: Columbia
- Producers: Timbaland; J.R. Rotem; Ne-Yo; Swizz Beatz; Mark Murrille

Empire: Original Soundtrack Season 2 Volume 2 is the third soundtrack album by the cast of the musical drama television series Empire which airs on Fox. The album includes songs that featured during the second season of the show. It was released on April 29, 2016. The Soundtrack was Recorded & Mixed at Periscope Post & Audio in Chicago, IL. Mixed By Jason Nuemann, Andrew Twiss, Kevin Davis, Justin Hind, Matt Gubernick, Jim Beanz, & Rodney "Every Ave" Murrille.

== Track listing ==
Empire: Original Soundtrack Season 2 Volume 2 – Standard version
No.	Title	Writer(s)	Producer(s)	Length
1.	"Freedom" (Jussie Smollett)	J.R. Rotem; Ruth-Anne Cunningham; Jesse Geller; Sean Fenton; Teal Douville	J.R. Rotem	3:06
2.	"Crown" (Jamila Velazquez, Raquel Castro and Yani Marin)	Rotem; Cunningham; Geller	J.R. Rotem	3:11
3.	"Look But Don't Touch" (Serayah)	James Washington; Justin Bostwick; Candice Nelson	Jim Beanz; J. Nick	3:44
4.	"Shine on Me" (Jussie Smollett and Bre-Z)	Shaffer Smith; Asia Bryant; Jesse Wilson; Tierce Person; Reynell Hay; Calesha Murray	Ne-Yo; Bostwick	3:26
5.	"All Nite (Yo Gotti Remix)" (Yazz, Serayah, Jamila Velazquez and Yo Gotti)	Mark Murrille; Mario Mims	Murrille	3:46
6.	"Body Speak" (Serayah)	Geller; Jessica Karpov	Jordan Palmer	2:11
7.	"Got That Work" (Yazz)	Murrille	Murrille	3:31
8.	"Chasing the Sky" (Terrence Howard, Jussie Smollett and Yazz)	Washington; Smollett	Beanz	4:28
9.	"No Competition" (Yazz and Serayah)	Washington; Bostwick; Megan Thomaston	Beanz	3:31
10.	"Hemingway" (Jussie Smollett)	David Michael Ott, Jr.; Smollett	Ott	3:43
11.	"My Own Thang" (Jussie Smollett and Bre-Z)	Smith; Jesse Wilson; Jason Lee York; Murray; Reynell Hay	Ne-Yo; Corparal	2:52

Empire: Original Soundtrack Season 2 Volume 2 – Deluxe edition
No.	Title	Length
1.	"Freedom" (Jussie Smollett)	3:05
2.	"Crown" (Jamila Velazquez, Raquel Castro and Yani Marin)	3:11
3.	"Look But Don’t Touch" (Serayah)	3:44
4.	"Good People" (Jussie Smollett and Yazz)	3:22
5.	"Like My Daddy" (Jussie Smollett)	2:26
6.	"Shine on Me" (Jussie Smollett and Bre-Z)	3:25
7.	"All Nite" (Yazz, Serayah and Jamila Velazquez)	2:57
8.	"Body Speak" (Serayah)	2:11
9.	"Last Night" (Jussie Smollett and Bre-Z)	2:04
10.	"Get It Started" (Jussie Smollett and Kelli Wakili)	2:51
11.	"Got That Work" (Yazz)	3:31
12.	"Good Enough (Negrito Remix)" (Jussie Smollett)	3:13
13.	"Chasing the Sky" (Terrence Howard, Jussie Smollett and Yazz)	4:17
14.	"No Competition" (Yazz and Serayah)	3:30
15.	"Hemingway" (Jussie Smollett)	3:43
16.	"My Own Thang" (Jussie Smollett)	2:52
17.	"Turn Around" (Bre-Z)	2:57
18.	"Fabulous" (DMK)	2:53
19.	"Never Let It Die" (Jussie Smollett and Yazz)	2:34
20.	"All Nite (Yo Gotti Remix)" (Yazz, Serayah, Jamila Velazquez and Yo Gotti)	3:45

== Charts ==
=== Weekly charts ===
Chart (2016)	Peak position
UK Albums (Official Charts)	139
US Billboard 200	26
US Top R&B/Hip-Hop Albums (Billboard)	5
US Soundtrack Albums (Billboard)	2

=== Year-end charts ===
Chart (2016)	Position
US Top R&B/Hip-Hop Albums (Billboard)	71
US Soundtrack Albums (Billboard)	17
