= Face's Music Party =

- Genre: Educational
- Directed by: Jonas Morganstein; David Kleiler
- Voices of: Cedric L. Williams
- Theme music composer: Joshua Johnson; Norman Spence II; DJ Raj Smoov; Jay Weigel
- Opening theme: "Welcome to Face's Music Party" by Ledisi
- Composers: Dani Buncher; Scott Simons
- Country of origin: United States
- Original language: English
- No. of seasons: 1
- No. of episodes: 16

Production
- Executive producers: David Kleiler; Hema Mulchandani; Jonas Morganstein
- Producer: Niki Williams
- Running time: 22 minutes
- Production companies: Jonas & Co.; Nickelodeon Productions; Nickelodeon Animation Studio

Original release
- Network: Nickelodeon (2022); Nick Jr. Channel (2022-2023)
- Release: June 3, 2022 – December 11, 2023

Face's Music Party is an American children's television series produced by Jonas & Co., Nickelodeon Productions and Nickelodeon Animation Studio that premiered on Nickelodeon on June 3, 2022 and ended on December 11, 2023.

== Premise ==
The series is hosted by longtime Nick Jr. mascot Face, now voiced by Cedric L. Williams. Face VJs modern pop hits and revamped nursery rhymes in this series, combining animation and live action.

== Episodes ==
No.	Title	Written by	Storyboarded by	Original release date	Prod. code	U.S. viewers (millions)
Part 1
1	"Friendship"	Story by : Magda Liolis; Teleplay by : Lindz Amer	Adam Beer	June 3, 2022	101	0.27
1	"Bugs"	Story by : David Kleiler; Teleplay by : Lindsey Owen	Adam Beer	June 3, 2022	101	0.27
Face returns to Nick Jr. for the first time in 18 years and plays the hottest children's songs that deal with friendship and insects.: Music videos: "Together" by Sia; "Sticky Icky" by Koo Koo Kanga Roo; Remixed Nursery Rhymes: "Make New Friends"; "The Ants Go Marching"; Music Box: Fiona and Ben demonstrate the "Dramatic Song"; Face plays "Guess The Insect" with Lilly; Dance Party Ending: "Iko Iko"; "La Cucaracha"
2	"Robots"	David Kleiler	Adam Beer	June 6, 2022	102	0.37
2	"Imagination"	Story by : David Kleiler; Teleplay by : Alyson Piekarsky	Adam Beer	June 6, 2022	102	0.37
Music videos: "Robots Dance" by The Pop Ups; "The Purple People Eater" by Sheb Wooley; Remixed Nursery Rhymes: "Head, Shoulders, Knees and Toes"; "Puff, the Magic Dragon" by Peter, Paul and Mary; Music Box: Juliano and Ace teach Face how to do the "Boots & Cats" beatboxing routine; Finn, Noah and Ca'ron perform in an imaginary rock band; Dance Party Ending: "Rockit" by Herbie Hancock; "Fantasy" by Run-DMC
3	"Help"	Story by : David Kleiler; Teleplay by : Darnell Lamont Walker	Adam Beer	June 13, 2022	103	0.19
3	"Change"	Story by : Jonas Morganstein; Teleplay by : Evan Sinclair	Adam Beer	June 13, 2022	103	0.19
Music videos: "Chores!" from Bubble Guppies, "Helping Others" by Darlingside; "Colors, Colors Everywhere" from Blue's Clues & You!; Remixed Nursery Rhymes: "Turn! Turn! Turn!" by Dan Zanes and Friends and Elizabeth Mitchell; Music Box: Meilinn and Aiza play a jazzy rendition of Beethoven's "Für Elise"; Lilly messes around with the keyboard synthesizers.; Dance Party Ending: "Rescue Me" by Fontella Bass; "Changes" by Ziggy Marley and the Melody Makers
4	"Pirates"	Story by : Jonas Morganstein; Teleplay by : Evan Sinclair	Adam Beer & James Fujii	June 20, 2022	104	0.21
4	"Confidence"	Story by : Magda Liolis; Teleplay by : Charlie Antosca	Adam Beer & James Fujii	June 20, 2022	104	0.21
Music videos: "The Wellerman (Sea Shanty)" (The TikTok Remix) by Nathan Evans ft. 220 Kid and Billen Ted, "Let's Go, Amigos!" from Santiago of the Seas; "Brave" by Sara Bareilles, "What I Like About Blue" from Blue's Clues & You!, "FREEDOM!!!!" by Jon Batiste; Remixed Nursery Rhymes: "Row, Row, Row Your Boat"; Music Box: A group of youngsters throw a pirate celebration; Indigo makes up songs while playing her ukulele.; Dance Party Ending: "Castaways" from The Backyardigans; "#1 You" by JoJo Siwa
5	"Heroes"	David Kleiler	Adam Beer & James Fujii	June 27, 2022	105	0.25
5	"Night"	Story by : Jonas Morganstein; Teleplay by : Evan Sinclair	Adam Beer & James Fujii	June 27, 2022	105	0.25
Music videos: "Safe and Sound" by Capital Cities, "Save The Day!" by The BeatBuds; "Night! Night!" from Bubble Guppies; Remixed Nursery Rhymes: "Twinkle, Twinkle Little Star"; Music Box: Leonard wails it on the trumpet and also plays the Nickelodeon jingle; Olivia plays Bach's "Prelude No. 1 in C Major" on the harp.; Dance Party Ending: "Heroes" by Alesso ft. Tove Lo; "Up All Night" by Beck
6	"Sun"	Story by : David Kleiler; Teleplay by : Lindsey Owen	Adam Beer	July 11, 2022	106	0.25
6	"Food"	Story by : Jonas Morganstein; Teleplay by : Darnell Lamont Walker	Adam Beer	July 11, 2022	106	0.25
Music videos: "Sunshine" by Tieks ft. Dan Harkna, "Steal My Sunshine" by Len; "Raining Tacos" by Parry Gripp; Remixed Nursery Rhymes: "You Are My Sunshine"; "Peanut Butter"; Music Box: Leonard has Face make up a song about summer while playing his ukulele; Mason uses different foods and kitchen utensils to bang on pots and pans.; Dance Party Ending: "Walking on Sunshine" by Katrina and the Waves; "Cooking in the Kitchen" by Chevy Woods
7	"Shake"	Story by : David Kleiler; Teleplay by : Alyson Piekarsky	Adam Beer & James Fujii	July 18, 2022	107	0.25
7	"Wind"	Story by : Jonas Morganstein; Teleplay by : Evan Sinclair	Adam Beer & James Fujii	July 18, 2022	107	0.25
Music videos: "Shake" by L.L.A.M.A ft. Ne-Yo and Cameron DeLeon, "The Sibling Shake" by Lucky Diaz and the Family Jam Band; "Fly Away" by Tones and I, "Windy" by The Association; Remixed Nursery Rhymes: "Shake My Sillies Out" by Raffi; "The North Wind Doth Blow"; Music Box: Avery and Drae make tambourines and maracas out of kitchen foods; Molly teaches Face how to whistle, a young boy shows Face his skills on the flute/piccolo.; Dance Party Ending: "Jump in the Line" by Harry Belafonte; "Ride Like the Wind" by Christopher Cross
8	"Dogs"	Story by : Jonas Morganstein; Teleplay by : Lindsey Owen	Luc Latulippe & James Fujii	July 25, 2022	108	0.30
8	"Bass"	David Kleiler	Luc Latulippe & James Fujii	July 25, 2022	108	0.30
9	"Space" "Space Party"	Story by : Jonas Morganstein; Teleplay by : Annie Arjarasumpun	Adam Beer	August 1, 2022	109	0.27
9	"Circles"	Story by : David Kleiler; Teleplay by : Lindsey Owen	Adam Beer	August 1, 2022	109	0.27
10	"Transportation"	Story by : David Kleiler; Teleplay by : Charlie Antosca	Adam Beer	August 8, 2022	110	0.25
10	"Rain"	Story by : David Kleiler; Teleplay by : Alyson Piekarsky	Adam Beer	August 8, 2022	110	0.25
11	"Jungle"	Story by : Jonas Morganstein; Teleplay by : Michelle McGee	Adam Beer	August 15, 2022	111	0.22
11	"Wild West"	Story by : Jonas Morganstein; Teleplay by : Lindsey Owen	Adam Beer	August 15, 2022	111	0.22
12	"Family"	Story by : Magda Liolis; Teleplay by : Alyson Piekarsky	Adam Beer	August 22, 2022	112	0.26
12	"Big Cats"	Story by : David Kleiler; Teleplay by : Darnell Lamont Walker	Adam Beer	August 22, 2022	112	0.26
13	"Mega Party"	Story by : Jonas Morganstein; Teleplay by : Rodney Stringfellow & Jonas Morganstein	Adam Beer	November 26, 2022 (Nick Jr.)	113	0.15
Specials
14	"Face's SuperSnowtacular Holiday Special"	Story by : Jonas Morganstein, Teresa Lee, Matthew Fichandler & Conor Biddle; Teleplay by : Teresa Lee	Adam Beer & George O. Holguin	December 1, 2022	TBA	0.19
15	"Face's Summertime Jam"	Story by : Jonas Morganstein, Teresa Lee, Matthew Fichandler & Conor Biddle; Teleplay by : Teresa Lee, Matthew Fichandler & Conor Biddle	Luc Latulippe & Cameron Lewis	June 30, 2023	TBA	N/A
Part 2
16	"Face's Holiday Countdown Party"	Story by : Bob Mittenthal, Benjamin Weiner & Jonas Morganstein; Teleplay by : Bob Mittenthal & Benjamin Weiner	Cameron Lewis, Howie Perry & Luc Latulippe	December 11, 2023	TBA	0.08
