= Jimmy Wopo =

American rapper (1997–2018)

- Jimmy Wopo in 2016

Background information
- Born: Travon DaShawn Frank Smart; January 13, 1997; Pittsburgh, Pennsylvania, U.S.
- Died: June 18, 2018 (aged 21) Pittsburgh, Pennsylvania, U.S.
- Cause of death: Homicide (gunshot wound)
- Education: The Academy Charter School
- Genre: Hip hop
- Occupations: Rapper
- Instrument: Vocals
- Years active: 2015–2018
- Label: Taylor Gang / 018 Muney Lane Records
- Formerly of: Muney Lane Muzik

Travon DaShawn Frank Smart (January 13, 1997 – June 18, 2018), better known by his stage name Jimmy Wopo, was an American rapper.

Wopo was an affiliate of fellow Pittsburgh-based rapper Wiz Khalifa and his Taylor Gang imprint. He made his first high-profile appearance with his 2016 breakout single, "Elm Street", produced by Stvii B, which Complex included in the "'Bout to Blow: 10 Dope New Songs You Should Be Hearing Everywhere Soon" list. Following that success, he collaborated with several prominent rappers including Wiz Khalifa, Sonny Digital, 21 Savage and more. After receiving a co-sign from hip hop producer Mike Will Made It, rap duo Rae Sremmurd brought Wopo out to perform during their set at the Pittsburgh stop of their SremmLife 2 Tour. Wopo was murdered in a drive-by shooting on June 18, 2018.

== Early life ==
Wopo was born January 13, 1997, in Pittsburgh, Pennsylvania, to Tammeka Dennison and James White Jr., and was one of 11 children. Wopo was raised in Pittsburgh’s Hill District, a historically black neighborhood. When Wopo was 7, he started rapping, but would not take it seriously until much later. When he was 14, he started to record music at a nearby studio, but was not allowed to cuss. He attended the Academy Charter School, but would drop out when he was in the tenth-grade. When he was a teenager, Wopo had been shot on two separate occasions. While he was recovering from his second shooting, he started to take rap more seriously.

== Career ==
In January 2015, Wopo began uploading original tracks to his SoundCloud account. Taylor Maglin, the owner of the Pittsburgh-based blog Daily Loud, partnered with him and began to publicize his music. This additional push helped him to accumulate millions of views on his music videos on his YouTube channel. Joining the wave of Wopo's viral success, urban hip hop blog WorldStarHipHop exclusively debuted five of his music videos in 2016. On July 24, 2016, he premiered his debut project, Woponese, on Daily Loud. This 8-track mixtape included the single "Back Door", which features Sonny Digital. In October 2016, Wopo was featured on Riff Raff's song "Stay Away from You" on his Balloween mixtape. On November 25, 2016, he released a joint album with his fellow Pittsburgh-based rapper Hardo. This nine-track project featured ShadyHigler, 21 Savage and Wiz Khalifa.

Before his death, Wopo completed 50 unreleased songs, which would be released posthumously according to Wopo's manager.

== Legal issues ==
On February 7, 2016, Wopo was arrested during a traffic stop in Washington County, Pennsylvania. Police arrested Wopo and two others after finding two stamp bags of suspected heroin and a small amount of marijuana. He was arraigned on drug charges and drinking charges and placed in jail with a $25,000 bond. Later, while out, Wopo, landed in jail because of probation violation. Wopo failed to inform officials of his trip to New York State, where he was caught and imprisoned on such charges. While in jail, he wrote an album, Back Against the Wall, which he recorded the first day he got out of jail.

== Murder ==
At 4:22 PM EDT on June 18, 2018, Wopo and a male passenger were shot while driving through Pittsburgh's Hill District neighborhood. The passenger survived, but Wopo, who was shot in the head, died after being rushed to UPMC Presbyterian at 5:56 PM. He was 21 years old, and left behind two children, with a third on the way. He was also murdered on the same day as fellow rapper XXXTentacion. As of 2025, no one has been charged for the murder.

Wopo has been posthumously implicated in numerous gang related crimes. Multiple members of his gang were sentenced to prison in 2021.

== Discography ==
- Woponese (2016)
- Trapnese (2016) (with Hardo)
- Jordan Kobe (2017)
- Back Against the Wall (2017)
