= Booty (Jennifer Lopez song) =

2014 song by Jennifer Lopez ft. Iggy Azalea

Promotional single by Jennifer Lopez featuring Pitbull

from the album A.K.A.
- Recorded: 2014
- Studio: Pink's Palace (Hidden Hills); Doppler Studios (Atlanta); Larrabee (North Hollywood)
- Genre: Dance
- Length: 3:23
- Label: Nuyorican; Capitol
- Songwriters: Cory Rooney; Jennifer Lopez; Benny Medina; Chris Brown; Asia Bryant; Armando Pérez; Thomas Wesley Pentz; Lewis D. Gittus; Tedra Renee Wilson; Danny Omerhodic
- Producers: Rooney; Lopez; Medina

"Booty"
- The official single version, featuring Iggy Azalea

Single by Jennifer Lopez featuring Iggy Azalea
- Released: August 24, 2014
- Recorded: 2014
- Studio: Pink's Palace (Hidden Hills); Doppler Studios (Atlanta); Larrabee (North Hollywood)
- Genre: Dance; hip-hop
- Length: 3:29
- Label: Nuyorican; Capitol
- Songwriters: Cory Rooney; Jennifer Lopez; Benny Medina; Chris Brown; Asia Bryant; Thomas Wesley Pentz; Lewis D. Gittus; Tedra Renee Wilson; Danny Omerhodic; Amethyst Amelia Kelly
- Producers: Rooney; Lopez; Medina

Jennifer Lopez singles chronology
"First Love" (2014)	"Booty" (2014)	"Feel the Light" (2015)

Iggy Azalea singles chronology
"Black Widow" (2014)	"Booty (Remix)" (2014)	"Beg for It" (2014)

Music video
- "Booty" on YouTube

"Booty" is a song by American singer Jennifer Lopez from her eighth studio album, A.K.A. (2014). It was written and produced by Cory Rooney, Lopez, and Benny Medina, with additional writing from Chris Brown, Pitbull (Lopez's frequent collaborator who is also the featured artist), Diplo, and others. "Booty" samples "Dat a Freak", a song by Diplo and Swick. Initially entitled "Big Booty", the song was first rejected by Lopez who did not like the idea of having a song with a title like that. However, after playing the demo for her kids and seeing that they enjoyed the track, Lopez was convinced to record it.

"Booty" is a dance track with Middle Eastern influences and heavy percussion while its lyrics portrait Lopez inviting girls to the dancefloor to have a good time and dance, while shaking their buttocks. The song received generally favorable reviews from music critics, with many complimenting the song's fun nature, the dance environment and Pitbull's appearance, but a few dismissed its concept. Commercially, "Booty" performed moderately worldwide. It became a top twenty hit in the United States, charting at number eighteen on the US Billboard Hot 100, and reached number 2 in India and Russia, as well as the top forty in Canada, Australia and New Zealand, among other music markets.

Lopez performed a snippet of the track during a concert and eventually premiered it full at an Orchard Beach concert. She has also performed the song on Good Morning America and at Fashion Rocks. A one-minute teaser clip for the track was released on June 13, 2014, and it features Lopez and a group of women twerking. The teaser-video received high praise for its visuals and choreography, while Lopez was complimented by critics for looking rejuvenated and younger.

"Booty" was officially remixed with vocals from Australian rapper Iggy Azalea, replacing those of Pitbull. It was released as the third single from the album on August 24, 2014. The remix received generally positive reviews from critics, who commended Azalea for adding an explosive verse to the song. The music video for the remix was shot in Los Angeles in late August, and was directed by Hype Williams. It premiered on September 18, 2014, and it shows Lopez and Azalea dancing in revealing swimming costumes, before being drenched with water. Lopez and Azalea performed "Booty" for the first time together on live television at the American Music Awards on November 23, 2014.

== Production and release ==
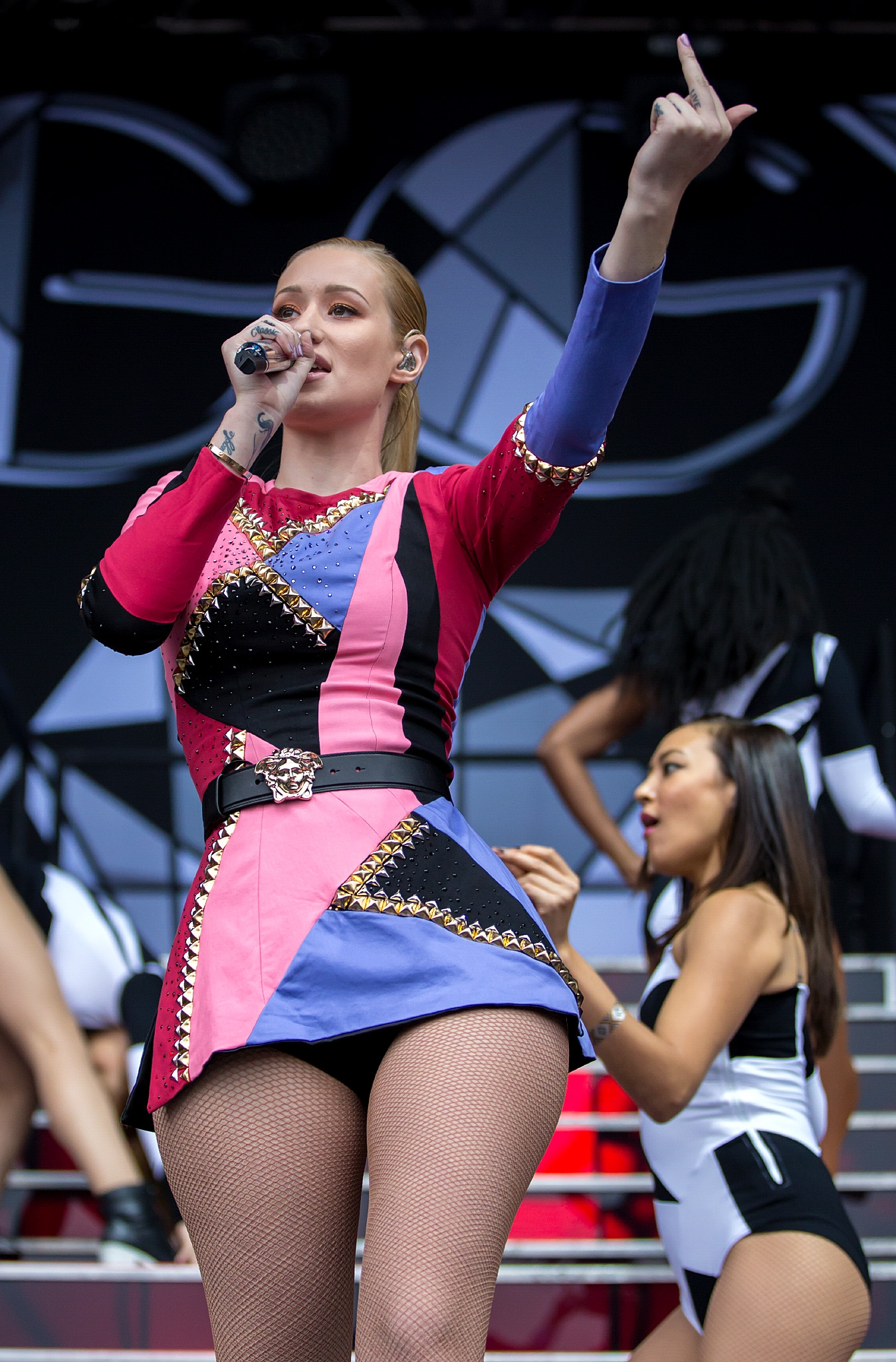
Iggy Azalea contributed a verse to the single version of "Booty".

In 2014, Lopez received a demo of a song called "Big Booty", produced by Diplo, and was encouraged to record the track, with everybody indicating that it was the type of track she needed to do. However, Lopez claimed: "Never in my life will I do a song called 'Big Booty', it would never happen," explaining that she felt it was going to be a joke and the album was very important. After some reluctance, Lopez ended up writing the track and played the demo in her car to see if it would work. While playing some tracks in her car, with her twins, Lopez stated that they instantly loved that the track: "As soon as they heard 'Big Booty' they went crazy. They loved this song and because of that I recorded it," she admitted. During a brunch where she debuted multiple songs from A.K.A., Lopez spoke of the track, saying: "I didn't allow myself to be put in a box. On this album, I did all of it. This is who I am and I have to embrace all of that and be as honest as I can be."

When Lopez released her eighth studio album, A.K.A., she enlisted Australian rapper Iggy Azalea as a last-minute addition. Azalea contributed to the track "Acting Like That" and claimed she was honoured to be part of the remix, because she "used to sit in [her] bedroom as a young girl and lip-sync Jennifer Lopez songs, so it's very cool to have a song with her on her album." They also performed "Acting Like That" for the first time during a concert at B96′s Summer Bash in Chicago and eventually became friends, with Lopez also appearing on Azalea's MTV fashion show House of Style. During their interview, Lopez revealed that "Booty" would be her next single and confirmed Azalea as the featuring guest. Lopez told that Azalea "did something on it and obviously because [they] have that in common," she says referencing their buttocks. Azalea completed that they "have high fashion booty."

"Booty" was released on September 23, 2014, for digital download. Lopez also posted the single's cover art, featuring both artists posing in swimsuits and heels, with wet hair and sultry stares and Lopez's buttocks nearly touching Azalea's. Jim Farber of New York Daily News wrote that the single's cover art "doubles the pleasure and doubles the fun, playing off the idea of a high-level booty summit as the two singers model the same swimwear and same flanks." Azalea's verses replace those of Pitbull, whose verses were about Lopez's buttocks-related skills. Azalea instead talks about her own skills, with the rapper singing, "They begging me drop down on ‘em, but right now, Iggy on the top/The last time the world seen a booty this good, it was on Jenny from the Block".

== Composition and lyrics ==
"Booty" was written by Jennifer Lopez, Cory Rooney, Benny Medina, Chris Brown, Pitbull, Asia Bryant, Lewis D. Gittus, Tedra Renee Wilson, Danny Omerhodic and Diplo. It was produced by Lopez, Rooney and Medina, while Pitbull is featured on the track, becoming the sixth time he and Lopez collaborated in a song. The song also samples "Dat a Freak" by Diplo & Swick (featuring TT the Artist and Lewis CanCut). "Booty" was considered the only dance track on the album, adding a quirky Middle Eastern vibe into the mix. Saeed Saeed of The National also noted that the song has "heavy percussion and Oriental keyboard riff." Alexa Camp of Slant Magazine described the song's lyrical content as "a tribute to ladies who are, uh, 'booty-full'." Lopez claimed that lyrically, it's about owning everything about you and who you are, and embracing that." Katie Hasty wrote for HitFix that, lyrically, "she is admiring others' [booties] and gazing at them on other people, while she is flaunting her own for you." Hasty also noted that in the song Lopez is "both the objectifier and the object."

== Critical reception ==
=== Pitbull version ===
Reception towards the song was positive, with many critics praising the song's fun nature and Pitbull verses. Amaya Mendizabal of Billboard praised the track, calling it "a massive dance record," writing that the potential hit "begs for a dance troop and some serious choreography." Rory Cashin of The Irish Times complimented Pitbull verses, calling them "fun" (noting that they never thought they'd actually write those words) and praised Lopez "on her most flirtatiously playful." In the same vein, Spin's Anupa Mistry called Pitbull's verse "voracious", writing that it's "an inspired pairing" that would likely perform well on radio.

Lydia Jenkin of The New Zealand Herald remarked that "though 'Booty' might have some of the most ridiculous lyrics she has ever been involved with, you know it is going to spend months being spun round club dance floors, and has some of that Beyoncé-ish military drum beat appeal that works so well with urban choreography." Phil Mogredien of The Observer was more critical with the song, writing that the song finds Lopez and Pitbull "celebrating big arses in spectacularly risible fashion." Devone Jones of PopMatters criticized her vocals, but praised its production and Pitbull's appearance, commenting:

The last song on the album, 'Booty', inspires very little hope that she will ever get out of the I-must-stop-teaming-up-with-Pitbull phase of her career. As usual, she doesn’t have the edginess to pull the vocals off, but Pitbull adds any flavour Jennifer should have injected. He may come up with anything new, but it at least helps the production, which is some of the best production on the album due to Diplo’s hand in it. Its dance-ability helps lift JLo’s lackluster and plain vocals."

=== Iggy Azalea version ===
The remix gathered positive reaction from music critics. Website Rap-Up praised the remix for "add[ing] an explosive verse to the bombastic banger." Brennan Carley of Spin enjoyed the track, claiming that Azalea "stomps in with some much stronger words for the haters than the ones Taylor Swift lobbed on 'Shake It Off'." Nolan Feeney of Time noted that Azalea appearance is now "thankfully on hand to inject the song with a little extra stuffing." Jim Farber of New York Daily News wrote that, musically, "the new take has more oopmh, courtesy of Azalea's rapid flow, not to mention the added story line of J. Lo playing butt-mentor to the new curvy flavor of the month." However, Farber also noted that "even in the remix, the song won't be as fetching to most fans as the women's figures. It has a fairly routine club beat, and Lopez' vocal remains pale and thin." Farber went on to comment on A.K.A's lackluster sales and how Azalea could help Lopez to regain success on the charts.

By inserting the butt-of-the-hour into her song, Lopez stands at least some chance of breathing life into her dead album. At this point, everything Azalea touches becomes a hit including her guest shot on Ariana Grande's "Problem" and her own smash "Fancy." Also, butts have a central role in today's pop work – obvious to anyone who watched the MTV Video Music Awards on Sunday."

== Commercial performance ==
For the week of September 24, 2014, it debuted on the Billboard Hot 100 at number 18, becoming the second highest debut of her career (behind only "On the Floor", also featuring Pitbull, which started at number 9 in 2011). "Booty" also marked the highest-charting Hot 100 entry from A.K.A. and her best single on the charts since 2012's "Dance Again", which peaked at number 17. Billboard reported that 92 percent of its Hot 100 points were attributed to streaming, as "Booty" entered the Billboard Streaming Songs chart with 9.2 million streams; 96 percent of which were Vevo on YouTube views. The song topped the Hot Dance Club Songs, becoming her 16th number-one there, surpassing Katy Perry to rank 7th overall for the most Billboard club chart-toppers. "Booty" was certified platinum by the Recording Industry Association of America (RIAA) on April 10, 2015.

In Canada, the song became the "Hot Shot Debut" on the Canadian Hot 100 chart, debuting at number 11. It became her highest debut on the chart to date, surpassing "Dance Again," which started at number 13. In other countries, "Booty" had moderate impact. In Australia, it debuted at number 27, its peak position, falling to number 44 the following week. In New Zealand, the song spent a week inside the "Recorded Music NZ" at number 30. In France, the song went on to debut and peak at number 93, one hundred positions higher than the album's lead-single, "First Love".

== Teaser video ==
To further promote "A.K.A.", Lopez shot teaser videos for some tracks of the album. The first was "Emotions", followed by "Worry No More" and "Booty". For the video, the singer wore printed leggings and a cherry-colored crop top with a snapback hat, transitioning into sequin booty shorts and a matching crop top. The one-minute teaser clip for "Booty" sees Lopez and a group of backup dancers in patterned tights twerking form against an industrial backdrop. Zayda Rivera of New York Daily News further explained the storyline: "Her voluptuous backside takes center stage in the music video as Lopez displays her own take on the dancing craze while instructing other women on just how to move it." Rivera also commented that the video "quickly confirmed why she's dominated dance in pop music since her big break as a Fly Girl on the hit ’90s sketch comedy series 'In Living Color'." Alex Heigl of People agreed, stating: "This is not some new-to-the-twerking-game rookie. This is how it's done. We hope you're ready." Rachel McRady of US Magazine declared that Lopez "reclaimed her title of most diva-licious derriere in the new teaser video for her upcoming single 'Booty'."

== Music video ==
=== Background and teaser ===
The music video for the song was shot on August 23, 2014 in Los Angeles and was directed by Hype Williams. During an interview at the 2014 MTV Video Music Awards, Jennifer Lopez stated about the video, "It's a lot of booty." A thirty-four second teaser for the video was released on September 4, 2014. Christina Garibaldi of MTV News went on to comment that, "The teaser has Lopez tossing aside all inhibitions as she proudly shows off her famous backside in a skin-tight, black bikini complete with fishnet stockings. J.Lo continues to flaunt her assets as she rubs herself down with water (or oil, we can’t determine), smokes a cigarette and shows everybody how she twerks. J. Lo and director Hype Williams turn up the sexiness by bringing in Iggy Iggs into the mix as the two ladies dance together in black-and-white bathing suits with slicked back wet hair, as Jennifer playfully touches her fellow big-booty collaborator." The full video premiered on September 18, 2014.

=== Storyline and reception ===
Lopez in the "Booty" music video

According to Marc Inocencio of RyanSeacrest.com:

"The video immediately opens with Lopez and Azelea both clad in skimpy, cleavage-bearing bathing suits, colliding their backsides with one another. A majority of the clip features a ton of booty twerking, spanking, and a seductive scene where JLo is rubbing oil around her derrière. In the final scene, Jennifer ...shakes her glorious backside in hyper speed while dressed fishnet stockings."

Katie Atkinson of Billboard claimed that the video "delivers exactly what the song promises," also noting that "Nicki Minaj's 'Anaconda' feels downright subtle next to this bootyfest." Lucas Villa of AXS drew a similar comparison, writing, "[Lopez and Azalea] certainly give Nicki Minaj's 'Anaconda' video a run for its money with their literal cheek-to-cheek moments." Jessica Hyndman of MTV News cited the "plenty of booty" in the video, the "hot oil", "the stiletto heels," the "sexy silhouettes", the "girl on girl grinding" and "J.LO's signature moves" as the "5-star recipe for a perfect music video." Bruna Nessif of E! Online wrote that "the video was a big sequence of bouncing bundonkadonk shots, which was great but also a little annoying because it's hard to focus," but ultimately claimed that "Iggy and J.Lo prove that they're the ultimate #TwerkTeam." Katie Hasty of HitFix was disappointed with the lack of dancing in the video, claiming that "Lopez – world-class dancer – doesn't really dance here. It's sexy, but I thought this was about booties on the dance floor and now I want my money back," also calling the video "generic". Eric Renner Brown of Entertainment Weekly described the video as "elegant and seductive", noting that it's also "seductively highbrow". It was named as one of the most unforgettable videos of the year by Cosmopolitan. In France, the music video was broadcast on some music channels after 10 p.m. following explicit suggestive content (twerk, spanking, nudity), lascives dance moves and raunchy scenes.

== Live performances ==
Lopez performed a snippet of "Booty" during her set at Power 106′s "Powerhouse 2014", on May 17, 2014. "Booty" was performed fully at her Orchard Beach free concert, in the Bronx, on June 4, 2014. Later, Lopez performed "Booty" once again on Good Morning America Concert Series, on June 20, 2014, being the first televised performance of the song. The performance had shirtless men cooling her down with large fans and placing her on a cushy white couch. Lopez also performed the track at her Foxwoods concert on June 21 and during her set at the "iHeartRadio Ultimate Pool Party", on June 28, 2014. Lopez performed "Booty" again at Fashion Rocks on September 9, 2014. Lopez wore a skimpy, sequined leotard-minidress and, according to US Magazine's Esther Lee, "she sang, danced, and twerked her way through the song with precision as the audience roared in response." Elizabeth Wagmeister of AOL.com wrote that Lopez "stole the night at 'Fashion Rocks'", writing that she "triple-threat sizzled as she unashamedly bared her back side as she stormed the stage", having people "wondering if she is in fact aging backwards."

Lopez and Azalea performed the remix version of the track together for the first time live during the latter's set at the 2014 We Can Survive Concert held at the Hollywood Bowl in Los Angeles on October 24, 2014. The song's first televised performance was during the 2014 American Music Awards, where both closed out the show. According to Shazam, the performance also included a preview of a new song titled "Throw Your Hair Back." The performance started out with Lopez in a black and white leotard "that showed off her famous assets", as cited by Allison Takeda from Us Magazine. Takeda continued the description, adding that "later, she was joined onstage by Azalea, who rocked a glittery metallic leotard. As they danced, patterned lights flashed across the stage, covering them in polka dots, stripes, and diamonds. During the performance, Lopez stopped singing to check out a ringing cell phone, which she dismissed with the offhand observation, "Just a booty call." Daniel D'Addario of Time named that the performance "was the most dynamic of the night," while Joe Lynch of Billboard called it "a perfect showstopper." Billy Johnson Jr. of Yahoo! Music said that it "demonstrated why she deserved the headlining spot of what was otherwise a rather uneventful telecast." Caryn Ganz of Rolling Stone selected it as one of the best, praising Lopez for showing that it was her performance, although Azalea was also featured. Ganz noted that "she got to hit all the contortionist high spots, and was the beneficiary of the best production moments. When she and Azalea did share the stage, it was still clear who was in charge. Then, just to further cement her status, Lopez closed the show solo, strutting and shaking her way across the stage before backing it up to Pitbull to send the show home." Lopez has performed the track during her Las Vegas residency show Jennifer Lopez: All I Have, where it was combined with elements of Drake's "Hotline Bling" (2015). She later performed the song as part of her medley during the 2018 MTV Video Music Awards on August 20, 2018 at Radio City Music Hall in New York City.

The song was featured in Lopez's setlist during the Super Bowl LIV halftime show.

== Track listings ==
- Digital download (Iggy Azalea version)
1. "Booty" featuring Iggy Azalea — 3:29
- Digital download (DaaHype Remix)
1. "Booty" (DaaHype Remix) featuring Iggy Azalea — 3:00
- Digital download (Vice Remix)
1. "Booty" (Vice Remix) featuring Iggy Azalea — 3:30
- Digital download (Bali Bandits Remix)
1. "Booty" (Bali Bandits Remix) featuring Iggy Azalea and Pitbull — 5:07
2. "Booty" (Bali Bandits Remix / Radio Edit) featuring Iggy Azalea and Pitbull — 3:37
- Digital download (JoeySuki Remix)
1. "Booty" (JoeySuki Vocal Mix) featuring Iggy Azalea and Pitbull — 5:30
2. "Booty" (JoeySuki Radio Mix) featuring Iggy Azalea and Pitbull — 3:01

== Charts ==
=== Weekly charts ===
Chart (2014)	Peak position
Australia (ARIA)	27
Belgium (Ultratop 50 Flanders)	33
Belgium Urban (Ultratop Flanders)	5
Belgium (Ultratip Bubbling Under Wallonia)	5
Canada Hot 100 (Billboard)	11
Chile (Top 20 Chart)	19
Finland Download (Latauslista)	90
France (SNEP)	93
Germany (GfK)	78
Greece Digital Songs (Billboard)	9
Hungary (Single Top 40)	35
India (Angrezi Top 20)	2
Italy (FIMI)	97
Lebanon (The Official Lebanese Top 20)	17
New Zealand (Recorded Music NZ)	30
Russia (NFPP)	2
South Korea (Gaon International Download Chart)	25
UK Singles (Official Charts Company)	137
UK Hip Hop/R&B (Official Charts)	17
US Billboard Hot 100	18
US Dance Club Songs (Billboard)	1
US Latin Airplay (Billboard)	43

=== Year-end charts ===
Chart (2014)	Position
Belgium Urban (Ultratop Flanders)	39

== Certifications ==
Region	Certification	Certified units/sales
Brazil (Pro-Música Brasil)	Gold	30,000^{‡}
United States (RIAA)	Platinum	1,000,000^{‡}
^{‡} Sales+streaming figures based on certification alone.

== Release history ==
Release dates and formats for "Booty"
Region	Date	Format	Version	Label	Ref.
Worldwide	August 24, 2014	Streaming	Pitbull (promotional single)	Nuyorican	
Worldwide	August 26, 2014	Streaming	Iggy Azalea	Nuyorican	
France	September 23, 2014	Digital download	Iggy Azalea		Universal
Germany	September 23, 2014	Digital download	Iggy Azalea		Universal
Italy	September 23, 2014	Digital download	Iggy Azalea		Universal
United Kingdom	September 23, 2014	Digital download	Iggy Azalea	Capitol	
United States	September 23, 2014	Digital download	Iggy Azalea	Nuyorican	
Spain	September 23, 2014	Digital download	Iggy Azalea	Universal	
United States	October 27, 2014	Digital download	Bali Bandits remix; DaaHype remix; JoeySuki remix; Vice remix	Nuyorican	
France	November 10, 2014	Digital download	Bali Bandits remix; DaaHype remix; JoeySuki remix; Vice remix	Universal	
Germany	November 10, 2014	Digital download	Bali Bandits remix; DaaHype remix; JoeySuki remix; Vice remix	Universal	
Italy	November 10, 2014	Digital download	Bali Bandits remix; DaaHype remix; JoeySuki remix; Vice remix	Universal	
Spain	November 10, 2014	Digital download	Bali Bandits remix; DaaHype remix; JoeySuki remix; Vice remix	Universal	
