= Njomza =

American singer and songwriter (born 1994)

- Born: Njomza Vitia; April 22, 1994 (age 32); Ludwigsburg, Germany
- Origin: Chicago, Illinois, U.S.
- Occupations: Singer; songwriter
- Instrument: Vocals
- Years active: 2007–present
- Labels: Capitol; Motown; REMember; SinceThe80s
- Website: notnjomza.com

Njomza Vitia (/ˈnjɒmzə ˈviːtiə/; Albanian: [ˈɲɔmza viˈtia]; born 22 April 1994) is an American singer and songwriter. She is currently signed with Capitol, Motown, and SinceThe80s. Since 2013, she has released one mixtape and three EPs.

== Early life ==
Njomza Vitia was born to Kosovo Albanian parents in Ludwigsburg, Germany, and grew up in Chicago, Illinois. Her father, Faik Vitia, and her mother, Sheki Vitia (née Haziri) are from Pristina, Kosovo. Her parents left Kosovo in 1992. She has an older sister. As a child, Njomza was introduced to R&B music through her sister, and began listening to rock and pop rock music during middle school.

== Career ==
Njomza began her career in music as the front woman for an alternative band called Scarlett. The band had a strong following and played Warped Tour in 2010. Once the band dismantled in 2011, Njomza went on to pursue her career as a solo artist. She posted cover versions on YouTube of Mac Miller, Kid Cudi, and various other artists. She was discovered by Mac Miller, who signed her to his Warner Bros. Records imprint, REMember Music.

She also co-wrote Ariana Grande's songs "7 Rings" and "Thank U, Next".

== Discography ==
=== Extended plays ===
Title	Album details
Sad For You	Released: April 7, 2017; Label: REMember; Format: Digital download
Vacation	Released: November 9, 2018; Label: SinceThe80s, Motown, Capitol; Format: Digital download
LIMBO	Released: June 25, 2021; Label: SinceThe80s, Motown, Capitol; Format: Digital download
STAGES	Released: May 12, 2023; Label: SinceThe80s, Empire Distribution; Format: Digital download

=== Mixtapes ===
Title	Album details
Gold Lion	Released: April 22, 2013; Label: REMember; Format: Digital download
