= SinceThe80s =

- Parent company: Universal Music Group
- Founded: 2017; 9 years ago
- Founder: Barry "Hefner" Johnson; Zekiel "Zeke" Nicholson
- Distributor: Motown
- Genre: Hip hop, R&B
- Country of origin: United States
- Location: Atlanta, Georgia; Pittsburgh, Pennsylvania
- Official website: sincethe80s.com

SinceThe80s is an American record label, management, and publishing company founded by Barry "Hefner" Johnson, and Zekiel "Zeke" Nicholson, based in Atlanta and Pittsburgh. The label is a joint venture with Motown, a subsidiary of Universal Music Group.

== History ==
Barry "Hefner" Johnson started in the music industry from marketing and promotion with Warner Music Group and Sony Music, promoting Pittsburgh artists such as Wiz Khalifa and Mac Miller. In 2014, Kei Henderson met 21 Savage during the annual Atlanta hip-hop festival, A3C, and became his manager, while Johnson and Zekiel Nicholson co-manage JID and EarthGang, who both signed with Dreamville in 2017. They made the progression from management to label executives since they already take on those responsibilities as managers, and launched SinceThe80s. Henderson told Billboard, "I realized how much I was doing on my own, everything from merch design, web design, staffing a team [and] hiring radio."

In an interview with Billboard, they said the label is envisioned "as a collaborative brand that seeks to find and nurture the next wave of superstars from the culture hub of Atlanta." In 2019, the founders of label played an intricate part in Dreamville's recording sessions for the compilation album Revenge of the Dreamers III. Johnson and Nicholson convinced J. Cole to host the studio sessions at Tree Sound Studios in Atlanta instead of Los Angeles. Every artist on the label was invited to the sessions in Atlanta with the goal of fostering connections with other artists that attended. Johnson says Cole has "always been supportive" of SinceThe80s and has relationships with other Atlanta-based labels such as Love Renaissance.

The label houses artists Njomza, Hardo, Asiahn, and Jordan Hawkins. In 2020, the label added Metro Marrs to the roster who signed a joint deal with Quality Control, as well as Benji who is part of the collective Spillage Village. The also house producers Christo, Malik Baptiste, Tommy Brown, and Pyrex.

== Publishing ==
District 80 Publishing is an American music publisher part of SinceThe80s. The company published number 1 singles such as Ariana Grande's "Thank U, Next", "7 Rings", and "Positions", co-written by Tommy Brown and Njomza, "Better Off" and "Make Up", co-written by Malik Baptiste.

== Roster ==
=== Current artists ===
Act	Year signed	Releases under the label
Njomza	2018	2
Hardo	2018	7
Johnny Venus	2025	1
EarthGang	2021	4
Metro Marrs	2020	5
Benji.	2020	5
Spillage Village	2020	13
AKIA	2023	2

=== Management ===
- JID
- EarthGang
- SoFaygo
- PopLord
- Hardo
- AKIA
- Christo
- NJOMZA

=== District80s producers ===
- Christo
- Malik Baptiste
- Tommy Brown
- Bakkwoods

== Discography ==
=== Studio albums ===
Artist	Album	Details
Asiahn	Love Train 2	Released: January 11, 2019; Label: SinceThe80s; Format: Digital download
Hardo	Days Inn	Released: April 24, 2020; Label: SinceThe80s; Format: Digital download
Spillage Village	Spilligion	Released: September 25, 2020; Label: Dreamville, Interscope, SinceThe80s; Format: Digital download
Hardo & Deezlee (with DJ Drama)	Fame or Feds 3	Released: July 23, 2021; Label: SinceThe80s, Trap Illustrated; Format: Digital download
Benji.	Smile, You're Alive!	Released: September 29, 2021; Label: SinceThe80s; Format: Digital download

=== Extended plays ===
Artist	Album	Details
Njomza	Vacation	Released: November 9, 2018; Label: SinceThe80s, Motown, Capitol; Format: Digital download
Hardo	Trapn Fever 2	Released: November 27, 2020; Label: SinceThe80s; Format: Digital download
Asiahn	The Interlude	Released: January 11, 2021; Label: SinceThe80s, Motown; Format: Digital download
Asiahn	The Interlude (Orchestral Performance)	Released: March 18, 2021; Label: SinceThe80s, Motown; Format: Digital download
Njomza	LIMBO	Released: June 25, 2021; Label: SinceThe80s, Motown; Format: Digital download
Jordan Hawkins	Heart Won't Stop	Released: October 27, 2021; Label: SinceThe80s; Format: Digital download

=== Mixtapes ===
Artist	Album	Details
Metro Marrs	Popular Loner	Released: June 18, 2021; Label: Quality Control; Format: Digital download
