= List of Jennifer Lopez live performances =

Jennifer Lopez live performances
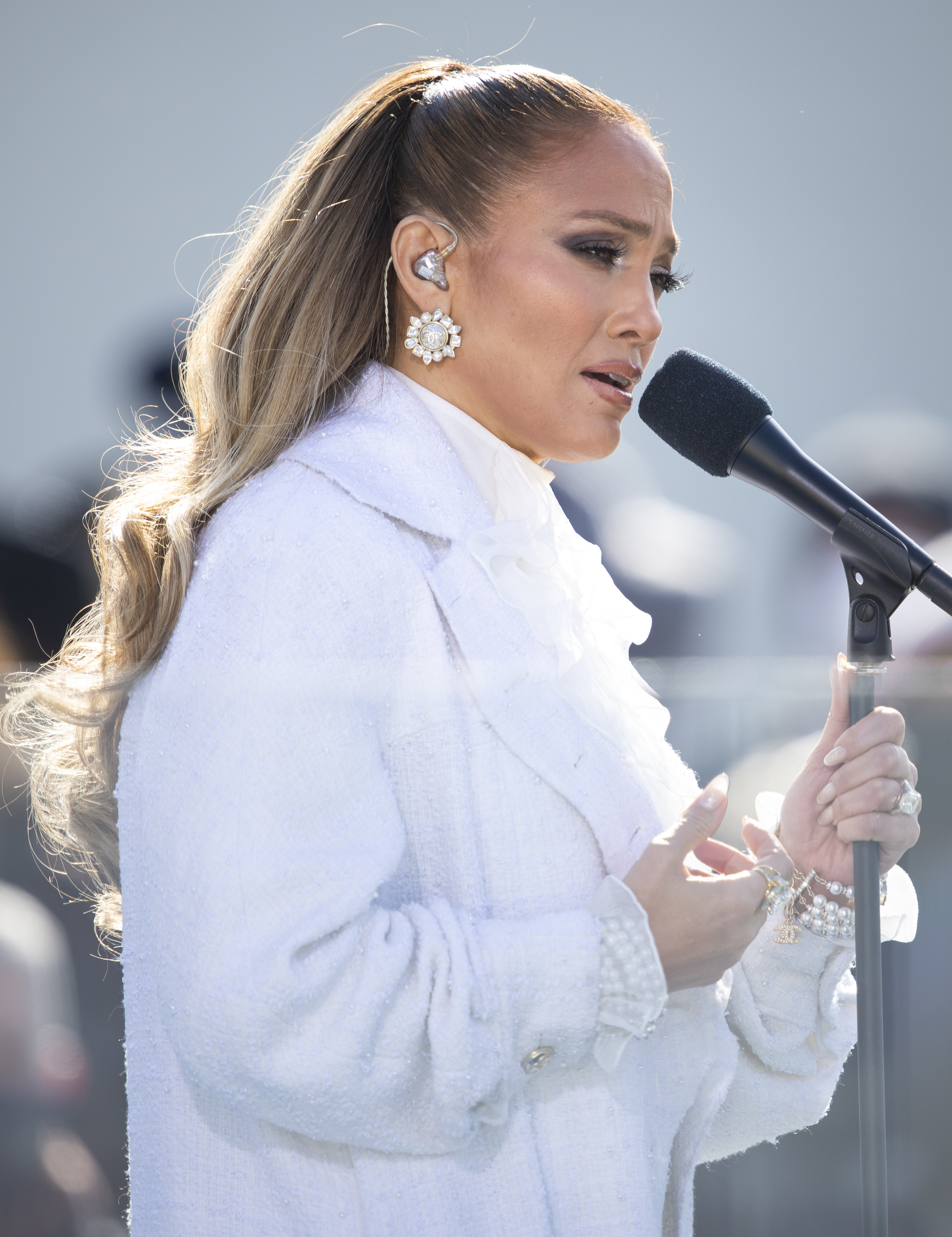
- Lopez performing in 2021
- Concert tours: 5
- Concert residencies: 2
- Limited engagements: 1
- One-off concerts: 12
- Charity events: 9
- Music festivals: 7
- Sports events: 6
- Award shows: 35
- Live TV performances: 40

American entertainer Jennifer Lopez has embarked on five concert tours, two residencies and has performed various one-off concerts. As of 2021, Lopez has over $248 million lifetime touring gross. She is the 17th highest-grossing female artist of the 21st century worldwide, with $232.6 million and 1.7 million tickets sold from 235 shows.

== Concert tours ==
=== Headlining ===
Title	Duration	Continent(s)	Shows	Ref.
Dance Again World Tour	June 14, 2012 – December 22, 2012	Australia; Asia; Europe; North America; South America	53	
It's My Party	June 7, 2019 – August 11, 2019	Africa; Asia; Europe; North America	37	
Up All Night Tour	July 8 – August 12, 2025	Asia; Africa; Europe	22	

=== Co-headlining ===
Title	Duration	Continent(s)	Shows	Ref.
Jennifer Lopez & Marc Anthony en Concierto	September 24, 2007 – November 7, 2007	North America	19	
Enrique Iglesias & Jennifer Lopez Tour	July 14, 2012 – September 1, 2012	North America	24	

=== Cancelled tours ===
Title	Duration	Continent(s)	Shows	Ref.
This Is Me... Live	June 26, 2024 – August 27, 2024	North America	30	

== Concert residencies ==
Title	Duration	Venue	City	Shows	Ref.
Jennifer Lopez: All I Have	January 20, 2016 – September 29, 2018	Zappos Theater	Las Vegas	121	
Jennifer Lopez: Up All Night Live in Las Vegas	December 30, 2025 – March 28, 2026	The Colosseum at Caesars Palace	Las Vegas	12	

== Limited engagements ==
Title	Duration	Venue	City	Ref.
Let's Get Loud	September 22 - September 23, 2001	Roberto Clemente Coliseum	San Juan, Puerto Rico	

== One-off concerts ==
Event	Date	Venue	City	Ref.
Madison Square Garden with Marc Anthony	September 26, 1998	Madison Square Garden	New York	
Jennifer Lopez: Live in Athens	September 20, 2008	O.A.C.A. Olympic Indoor Hall	Athens	
Mohegan Sun Arena's 15th anniversary celebration	October 22, 2011	Mohegan Sun Arena	Uncasville	
Gurbanguly Berdimuhamedow 56th Birthday Celebration	June 29, 2013	Avaza	Turkmenbashi	
2014 Singapore Grand Prix	September 21, 2014	Padang Stage	Singapore	
Private concert for Telemundo advertising clients	May 16, 2016	Hammerstein Ballroom	New York City	
Hillary Clinton campaign concert	October 29, 2016	Bayfront Park Amphitheater	Miami	
Jennifer Lopez Live	April 15, 2017	Altos de Chavón Amphitheater	La Romana	
Jennifer Lopez Live in Dubai	November 17, 2017	Autism Rocks Arena	Dubai	
AT&T Presents DirecTV Now Super Saturday Night	February 3, 2018	The Armory	Minneapolis	
Doha Festival City: Grand Opening	November 8, 2018	Doha Festival City	Doha, Qatar	
Annual General Meeting & World Air Transport Summit 2022: Private IATA and AGM Gala Dinner	June 20, 2022	Khalifa International Stadium	Doha, Qatar	

== Charity events ==
Event	Date	City	Ref.
Chime For Change: The Sound of Change	June 2, 2013	London	
We Day	October 22, 2014	Vancouver	
Tidal X Brooklyn	2017	Brooklyn	
One Voice: Somos Live!	October 14, 2017	Los Angeles	
Robin Hood Benefits	May 14, 2018	New York City	
Global Citizen: VAX LIVE	May 2, 2021	Inglewood	
Global Citizen Live	September 25, 2021	New York City	
Los Angeles Dodgers Foundation: 6th Annual Blue Diamond Gala	June 17, 2022	Los Angeles	
LuisaViaRoma x UNICEF charity gala	July 30, 2022	Capri	

== Music festivals ==
Event	Date	City	Ref.
Wango Tango Music Festival	May 14, 2005	Anaheim, California	
iHeartRadio Music Festival	September 24, 2011	Las Vegas, Nevada	
iHeartRadio Ultimate Pool Party	November 25, 2014	Miami, Florida	
Mawazine Festival	May 29, 2015	Rabat	
iHeartRadio Music Festival	September 19, 2015	Las Vegas, Nevada	
iHeartRadio Fiesta Latina	November 7, 2015	Miami, Florida	
iHeartRadio Fiesta Latina	November 2, 2019	Miami, Florida	

== Sport events ==
Event	Date	Venue	City	Ref.
FIFA Women's World Cup	July, 1999	Rose Bowl	Pasadena, California	
FIFA U-17 Women's World Cup	September 22, 2012	Mugam Centre	Baku	
Dubai Horse Race World Cup	March 29, 2014	Meydan Racecourse	Dubai	
FIFA World Cup	June 12, 2014	Arena Corinthians	São Paulo	
Super Bowl LIV Halftime Show	February 2, 2020	Hard Rock Stadium	Miami Gardens	

== Award shows ==
American Music Awards
Year	Song(s)	Note
1991	"Games"	As a Dancer for New Kids on the Block
2001	"Love Don't Cost a Thing"	
2009	"Louboutins"	
2011	"Until It Beats No More" "Papi" "On The Floor"	Featuring: Pitbull
2011	"T.H.E. (The Hardest Ever)"	Featuring: Will.I.Am
2013	"Químbara" "Bemba Colorá" "La Vida Es Un Carnaval"	A Tribute to Celia Cruz
2014	"Booty"	Featuring: Iggy Azalea
2015	"Waiting For Tonight" "Uptown Funk" "Anaconda" "7/11" "Feeling Myself" "The Hills" "Can't Feel My Face" "Girl Crush" "Bad Blood" "Trap Queen" "Hotline Bling" "Thinking Out Loud" "Love More" "Where Are Ü Now" "Bitch Better Have My Money"	Dance Medley: Greatest Hits of the Year
2018	"Limitless"	
2020	"Pa' Ti + Lonely"	Featuring: Maluma
2025	"Dance Again" "Squabble Up" "Denial is a River" "A Bar Song (Tipsy)" "APT." "I Had Some Help" "Hot to Go!" "Good Luck, Babe" "Birds of a Feather" "Texas Hold Em" "Nuevayol" "Beautiful Things" "Lose Control" "Die with a Smile" "Nasty" "Espresso" "Sports Car" "Guess" "Not Like Us/ TV Off"	Dance Medley: Greatest Hits of the Year

Grammy Awards
Year	Song(s)	Note
2005	"Escapémonos"	Featuring: Marc Anthony
2016	"Olvídame y Pega la Vuelta"	"Latin Grammy Awards" Featuring: Marc Anthony
2019	"Dancing in the Street" "Please Mr. Postman" "Money (That's What I Want)" "Do You Love Me" "ABC" "My Girl" "Papa Was a Rollin' Stone" "War" "Square Biz" "Another Star"	A Tribute to Motown Records Featuring: Smokey Robinson, Alicia Keys & Ne-Yo

Billboard Awards
Year	Song(s)	Note
1999	"Waiting For Tonight"	
2013	"Live It Up"	Featuring: Pitbull
2014	"We Are One"	Featuring: Pitbull & Claudia Leitte
2014	"First Love" "Aint No Mountain High Enough"	
2015	"Como la Flor" "Bidi Bidi Bom Bom" "Amor Prohibido" "I Could Fall in Love" "No Me Queda Mas".	"Latin Billboard Music Awards" A Tribute to Selena
2017	"Mirate" (Un-released Single)	"Latin Billboard Music Awards"
2018	"Dinero"	Featuring: DJ Khaled
2018	"El Anillo"	"Latin Billboard Music Awards"

MTV Awards
Year	Song(s)	Note
1993	"That's The Way Love Goes" "If"	As a Dancer For Janet Jackson
2000	"Love Don't Cost a Thing"	"MTV Europe Music Awards"
2001	"I'm Real"	Featuring: Ja Rule
2010	"Get Right" "Get Back"	"MTV Movie Awards" Featuring: Tom Cruise
2018	"Waiting For Tonight" (Hex's Momentous Club Mix) "On The Floor" "Dance Again" "Aint Your Mama" "If You Had My Love" (Pablo Flores Remix, dance break) "El Anillo" "Booty" (With elements from "El Anillo" and the Pablo Flores Remix of "If You Had My Love") "Love Don't Cost a Thing" (With elements from "In My Feelings" and "Nice for What" by Drake) "I'm Glad" "Get Right" "All I Have" "Jenny From The Block" (With elements from "20 Minute Workout" by DJ Kool and "Started from the Bottom" by Drake) "I'm Real" (Murder Remix) "Aint It Funny" (Murder Remix) "Dinero" (With elements from "Bodak Yellow" by Cardi B and "Bitch Better Have My Money" by Rihanna)	MTV Video Vanguard Medley Performance Featuring: DJ Khaled & Ja Rule

Other Award Shows
Year	Song(s)	Note
2000	"Feelin So Good"	"Kids Choice Awards"
2001	"Aint It Funny"	"TOTP Awards"
2005	"Get Right"	"NRJ Music Awards"
2007	"Que Hiciste"	"Echo Awards"
2007	"Get Right"	"TOTP Awards"
2010	"Louboutins" (Remix, contains elements of "20 Minute Workout") "Get Right" "Jenny from the Block" "Love Don't Cost a Thing" (RJ Schoolyard Mix) "If You Had My Love" (followed by a dance break to the Pablo Flores remix) "Waiting for Tonight" (Hex's Momentous Club Mix) "Feelin' So Good" (contains elements of "Play") "Let's Get Loud"	"World Music Awards"
2013	"Lambada" "On The Floor" "Don't Stop The Party" "Dance Again" "Live It Up"	"Premios Juventud Awards" Featuring: Pitbull
2022	"Get Right" "On My Way"	"2022 iHeartRadio Music Awards" Featuring: Billy Porter and RuPaul's Drag Race

== Live TV performances ==
Year	Song(s)	TV Show	Note
2000	"Love Don't Cost a Thing"	Wetten, dass..?	
2005	"Get Right"	Wetten, dass..?	
2007	"Que Hiciste"	American Idol (Season 6)	
2011	"On The Floor"	Wetten, dass..?	
2011	"I'm Into You" "On The Floor"	American Idol (Season 10)	Featuring: Pitbull
2011	"Aguanile"	American Idol (Season 10)	As a Dancer Featuring: Marc Anthony & Sheila E
2012	"Dance Again"	Wetten, dass..?	
2012	"Dance Again"	American Idol (Season 11)	
2012	"Goin` In" "Follow The Leader"	American Idol (Season 11)	Featuring: Flo Rida, Lil Jon, Wisin & Yandel
2013	"Live It Up"	American Idol (Season 12)	Featuring: Pitbull
2014	"I Luh Ya Papi"	American Idol (Season 13)	Featuring: French Montana
2014	"First Love"	American Idol (Season 13)	
2014	"Go Your Own Way" "True Colors"	American Idol (Season 13)	Featuring: Harry Connick, Jr., Randy Jackson & Keith Urban
2015	"Feel The Light"	American Idol (Season 14)	
2015	"Back It Up"	American Idol (Season 14)	Featuring: Prince Royce & Pitbull
2015	"Diamonds" "Locked Out of Heaven"	American Idol (Season 14)	Featuring: Harry Connick, Jr. & Keith Urban
2016	"Ain't Your Mama" "Let's Get Loud"	American Idol (Season 15)	
2009	"Louboutins"	The Ellen Show	
2015	"If You Had My Love" "Love Don't Cost a Thing" "Jenny From The Block" "Get Right" "On The Floor"	The Ellen Show	
2018	"Limitless"	The Ellen Show	
2013	"Live It Up"	Britain's Got Talent	
2011	"On The Floor"	X Factor (France)	
2010	"Louboutins" "Waiting For Tonight" "Let's Get Loud"	New Year's Eve	Dick Clark's New Year's Rockin' Eve, Live from Time Square
2017	"If You Had My Love" "Get Right" "Tens" "Waiting For Tonight" "On The Floor"	New Year's Eve	NBC's New Year's Eve, Live from Las Vegas, Jennifer Lopez: All I Have
2019	"Limitless" "Aud Lang Syne" "Live It Up"	New Year's Eve	NBC's New Year's Eve
2021	"In The Morning" "Waiting For Tonight" "Dream On" "Dance Again"	New Year's Eve	Dick Clark's New Year's Rockin' Eve, Live from Time Square
2000	"Feelin So Good" "Waiting For Tonight"	Saturday Night Live (Season 25)	
2001	"Play" "Love Don't Cost a Thing"	Saturday Night Live (Season 26)	
2010	"Until It Beats No More" "Starting Over"	Saturday Night Live (Season 35)	
2024	"Can't Get Enough" (With elements from "Da Goodness" by Redman) "This Is Me... Now"	Saturday Night Live (Season 49)	Featuring: Latto & Redman
2007	"Hold It Don't Drop It" "Do It Well" "Let's Get Loud"	Good Morning America	
2014	"Booty" "First Love" "On The Floor" "Never Satisfied" "Let's Get Loud"	Good Morning America	
2001	"Play" "Love Don't Cost a Thing"	Today Show	
2002	"The One" "Loving You" "Jenny From The Block" "All I Have"	Today Show	Featuring: LL Cool J
2005	"Jenny From The Block" "Aint It Funny" "Waiting For Tonight" "Love Don't Cost a Thing" "Get Right" "Hold You Down"	Today Show	Featuring: Fat Joe
2016	"Love Make The World Go Round"	Today Show	Featuring: Lin-Manuel Miranda
2019	"Medicine" / "Jenny From The Block" "On The Floor"	Today Show	
2007	"Do It Well" "Let's Get Loud"	Dancing with the Stars	
2013	"Quizas, Quizas, Quizas"	Dancing with the Stars	Featuring: Andrea Bocelli
2014	"First Love"	The Tonight Show starring Jimmy Fallon	
1999	"If You Had My Love"	The David Letterman Show	
2007	"Do It Well"	The David Letterman Show	
2009	"Louboutins"	So You Think You Can Dance	
2007	"Do It Well" "Waiting For Tonight"	Fashion Rocks	
2014	"Booty"	Fashion Rocks	
