= This Is Me... Now =

2024 studio album by Jennifer Lopez

- Standard edition cover

Studio album by Jennifer Lopez
- Released: February 16, 2024
- Recorded: May and August 2022–June 29, 2023
- Studio: Lola's House (Beverly Hills) Henson (Los Angeles)
- Genre: R&B
- Length: 44:24
- Labels: Nuyorican; BMG
- Producers: BongoByTheWay; Rogét Chahayed; G-Ry; Jeff "Gitty" Gitelman; Bernard "Harv" Harvey; Hit-Boy; Tay Keith; Carter Lang; Angel Lopez; Kurtis McKenzie; T-Minus; Andrew Wansel; Sam Wish; Federico Vindver; Yeti

Jennifer Lopez chronology
Marry Me (2022)	This Is Me... Now (2024)	Kiss of the Spider Woman (2025)

Singles from This Is Me... Now
- 1. "Can't Get Enough" Released: January 10, 2024; 2. "Rebound" Released: February 13, 2024

This Is Me... Now is the ninth studio album by American singer Jennifer Lopez. It was released on February 16, 2024, via Nuyorican Productions and BMG Rights Management, marking her first release under this partnership. The album is heavily inspired by the rekindled romance between Lopez and Ben Affleck as well as their subsequent marriage, with themes of love and self-healing throughout. It is a sequel to Lopez's third studio album, This Is Me... Then (2002), and her first studio album in a decade since A.K.A. (2014). It was recorded between May and August 2022 and completed on June 29, 2023. It is the first Lopez album to feature no rappers on its standard edition since J.Lo (2001). Lopez contributed rap verses to three of the album's songs and co-wrote every one on the album, with production primarily from Rogét Chahayed, Jeff "Gitty" Gitelman and Angel Lopez.

Part of a three-part project documenting Lopez's search for love, self-healing, and her reunion with actor Ben Affleck, This Is Me... Now is accompanied by two further components. The second is a similarly titled, narrative-driven musical film, This Is Me... Now: A Love Story, co-written by Lopez, Affleck, Dave Meyers and Chris Shafer, with Meyers also directing. Aside from containing choreographed visuals for songs from the album, the film is a stylized and fictionalized narrative loosely based on Lopez's own life and her trials as a serial romantic. It features a cast of celebrities, including Fat Joe, Trevor Noah, Jane Fonda, Post Malone, Keke Palmer and Sofía Vergara, among others. The project's third component, a behind the scenes documentary called The Greatest Love Story Never Told was inspired by a collection of letters from Affleck to Lopez of the same name and explores the making of the music, film and documentary. It was released on February 27, 2024. All three components were produced simultaneously and were self-funded by Lopez with a budget of around $20 million.

This Is Me... Now was preceded by the lead single, "Can't Get Enough", which samples Alton Ellis's 1967 song "I'm Still in Love with You". Following its release, the song appeared on several national single charts and spawned a remix featuring rapper Latto. Alongside Latto and rapper Redman, Lopez performed the song on Saturday Night Live. A remix for "Rebound", featuring Puerto Rican rapper Anuel AA, was released alongside the album, as the second single. The title track and a remix of "This Time Around", featuring (G)I-dle, were released as promotional singles.

Upon its release, This Is Me... Now received mixed-to-positive reviews, with praise for Lopez's matured vocals and criticism for its themes. Commercially, the album entered at number 38 on the US Billboard 200 and sold 14,000 copies in its debut week. It would also chart within the top 10 of charts in Austria, Belgium, Germany, and the United Kingdom, and peak at the top of the UK R&B Albums and US Indie Store Album Sales charts. Lopez was set to embark on This Is Me... Live to promote the album, her first tour in five years, but was canceled citing Lopez's need to be with her family, amid reports of poor ticket sales. In August 2024, it was revealed that Lopez and Affleck were divorcing.

== Background and inspiration ==
In mid-2021, Lopez signed a multi-year deal with Netflix to produce a range of films and television shows through her own Nuyorican Productions. Lopez co-produced and starred opposite Owen Wilson and Maluma in the romantic comedy Marry Me, which was filmed in late 2019 and released in February 2022. During this time, Lopez had also reunited with former fiancé, actor Ben Affleck and the couple got engaged in April 2022. This reunion would serve as the primary inspiration for much of the album, film and documentary. On November 25, 2022, the 20th anniversary of the release of This Is Me... Then (2002), Lopez announced her ninth studio album, This Is Me... Now with a video she released on her social media, featuring her recreating that album's cover which morphs into a photograph for the new album. It is Lopez's first album in a decade, since 2014's A.K.A.

Lopez described the album as an "emotional, spiritual, and psychological journey she has taken over the past two decades." The album's lyrics are very confessional, with Lopez discussing the reputation of her love life. She stated, "People think they know things about what happened to me along the way, the men I was with—but they really have no idea, and a lot of times they get it so wrong. There's a part of me that was hiding a side of myself from everyone. And I feel like I'm at a place in my life, finally, where I have something to say about it." After initially securing investment for the project, Lopez forged ahead with a budget of around $20 million for the three-part conceptual project: This Is Me... Now (the album), This Is Me... Now: A Love Story (the music film based on music from the album) and the accompanying documentary The Greatest Love Story Never Told. After one of the funders pulled out, due to "not understanding the project", Lopez forged ahead before selling the rights to A Love Story to Amazon Prime. Later during a 2024 interview with Variety, it was noted that This Is Me... Now is a direct sequel to This Is Me...Then, and a deliberate nod to "old-school Lopez".

On June 29, 2023, Lopez posted a photo of herself featuring the album's title and the caption "album delivery day", alluding to the album being completed. In comments following the post, one of the album's producers, Rogét Chahayed said "It's time". On September 11, 2023, it was announced Lopez had signed a "recording and publishing partnership" deal with BMG Rights Management, in conjunction with her own Nuyorican Productions. Speaking about the album ahead of its release, Lopez stated she wanted to create an experience for fans, "We did a bunch of different album covers... We try to do stuff that's very special for the fans and do collector's items and things like that that they can have forever and ever", later in the same interview with Entertainment Tonight she opined, "the truth is I don't even know if I'll ever make another album after this. It's such the kind of quintessential kind of Jennifer Lopez J.Lo project and I really feel very fulfilled, so they really will be collector's items at a certain point."

The album was supposed to be supported by the This Is Me... Live tour in 2024; however, by May that year, the tour was cancelled, citing Lopez's need to be with her family. It was subsequently revealed in August 2024 that Lopez and Affleck were separated and pursuing a divorce.

== Concept and production ==
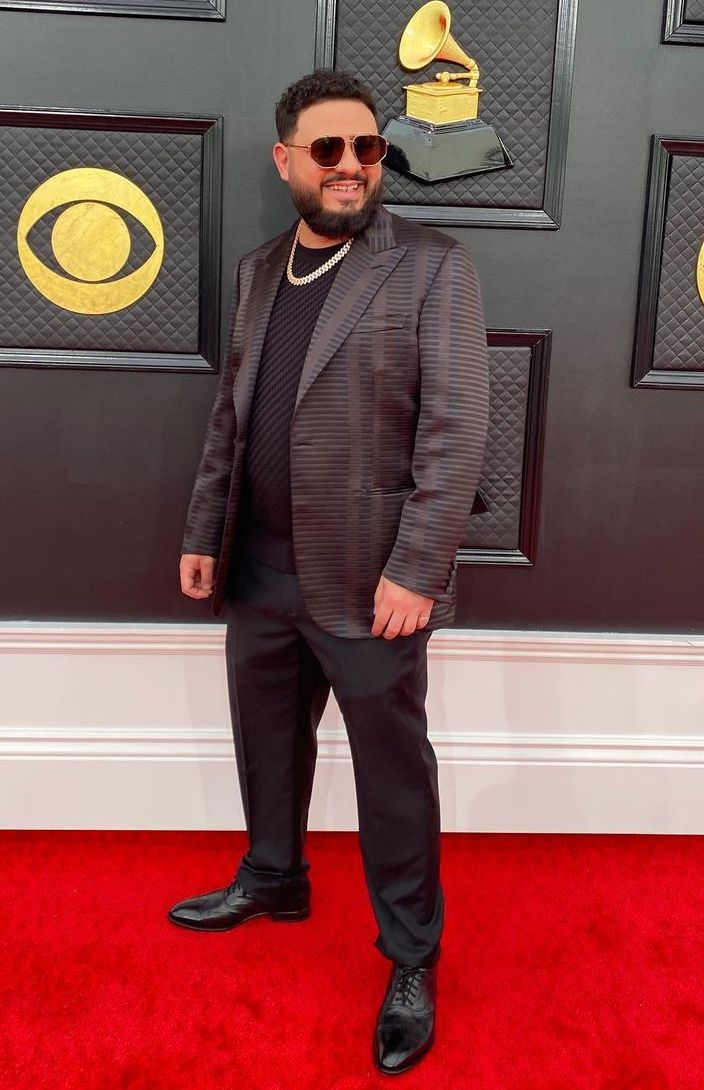
Rogét Chahayed was one of three main producers on the album.

This Is Me... Now is a pop and R&B album, with critics noting its "old-school" stylings. According to The Independent, this is in part due to the "cupid-plucked" harps present throughout the album's production. When discussing how the album came about, Lopez remarked that it was inspired by a conversation between her and her manager Benny Medina, where she told "untold stories about her search for love in the years between her first time with Affleck and the triumph of their reunification". It was Medina who first suggested making an album about the reunion, with Lopez subsequently convening a songwriters camp at her home. The starting point for the album was a collection of letters which Affleck wrote to Lopez and titled "The Greatest Story Never Told". According to Affleck, he found beauty and irony in the fact his and Lopez's love was the greatest love story never told, and remarking that "if you're making a record about it, that seems kind of like telling it". The album's final track and accompanying documentary are named after this collection of letters. According to Lopez, the collection of letters featured writings from Lopez and Affleck's original relationship as well as things that had been written since the duo reunited. Affleck gifted the letters in a book to Lopez on the first Christmas since their reunion. During an interview with Zane Lowe on Apple Music, Lopez confirmed that she worked primarily with a small group of producers on the album. It was primarily produced by Rogét Chahayed, Jeff "Gitty" Gitelman and Angel Lopez. During the first day, studio sessions led to the completion of the title track and the album's closing song, "The Greatest Story Never Told", which took its inspiration and name from the collection of letters.

Others like Kimberly "Kaydence" Krysiuk also joined the team. This Is Me... Now was written and produced primarily from May to August 2022, amidst Lopez's reunion and marriage to her ex Ben Affleck. Lopez confirmed that the reunion inspired her to get back into the studio and write honest music, in ways that she had not done since This Is Me... Then (2002). Lowe asked Lopez about the connection between This Is Me...Now and This Is Me...Then, wondering if the album would be about "rekindling that previous relationship and everything being great", Lopez responded "No. Its about celebratory moments with the person who is your soulmate. Yes I found him then and it didn't work out. ... We had work to do." Further sessions and additional credits come from Chauncey "Hit-Boy" Hollis, Tay Keith, Yeti Beats and Carter Lang, with the album completing recording and production in 2023. According to BMG, the album was mainly recorded at Lopez's home studio, Lola's House in Beverly Hills, Los Angeles. Several fellow artists contributed to the album including Justin Timberlake and Timbaland, British singer-songwriter Raye, Madison Love, and Jason DeRulo. Lowe noted that the harp features heavily in the production of the whole album, while Lopez also confirmed that this was deliberate in the sound she hoped to achieve, also commenting that "I didn't want to create a sound that was current or sounded like everything else being released at the moment".

== Songs and themes ==
The album is named after the opening song, "This Is Me... Now", and promotion leading up to the album's release, including some of its artwork prominently feature roses. Lopez's appearances at 'Couture Week' to promote the album and her Saturday Night Live performance of the title track featured outfits made of roses, with Harper's Bazar noting that the outfits embodied the title song's key themes of "love and self-healing". Uproxx noted that the title track was a "downtempo" ballad, and saw Lopez "basking in her rekindled love with Ben Affleck". It also features both a vocal sample and elements of the 2002 Justin Timberlake song "Cry Me a River", as well as being one of three songs to feature a rap verse from Lopez. A critic writing for The Arts Desk noted Lopez's vocal stylings on some tracks was "sassy rapping". Sal Cinquemani from Slant noted that This Is Me... Now is the first Lopez album since 2001's J.Lo to not feature any rap artists, although American rapper Latto features on the remix of "Can't Get Enough" and Puerto Rican rapper Anuel AA features on "Rebound", both taken from the deluxe edition. Other samples and interpolations are present on the album such as the second track "To Be Yours" which features an interpolation of "Superstar", as written by Leon Russell and Bonnie Bramlett. It also features additional vocals by Chaka Khan which were recorded specifically for the album by Trevor Muzzy at Henson Recording Studios in Los Angeles, California.

"Can't Get Enough" features a R&B production, reminiscent of Lopez's earlier music, with a breathy vocal style, over a beachy production according to Billboard's Gil Kaufman. It contains an interpolation of "I'm Still In Love With You", as written and composed by Alton Ellis and elements of "Son of a Scorpio" as written and performed by Dennis Coffey. "Not. Going. Anywhere" is the second to feature a rap verse from Lopez on this album. A critic writing for The Arts Desk noted Lopez's vocal stylings on some tracks was "sassy rapping". According to Slant, Affleck has "pitched-down" backing vocals on this song. "Rebound" features on the album twice, a solo version on all editions of the album and then a remix featuring Anuel AA on the deluxe edition. The album also includes a sequel to the This Is Me...Then song "Dear Ben" titled "Dear Ben, Pt. II". British singer-songwriter Raye co-wrote the song and sang background vocals on the track alongside Lopez, Jae Stephens and Steve Mackey. The song "Hearts and Flowers" has been referred to as a sequel to Lopez's 2002 single "Jenny from the Block" by critics like The Arts Desk. According to the album credits "Hearts and Flowers" interpolates part of "Jenny from the Block", which may explain some of the similarities. It also features a progressive cowbell in its production. "This Time Around" is the final song to feature rap vocals from Lopez. It also features co-writing and production from Argentine producer Federico Vindver. "Broken Like Me" is a ballad featuring Spanish guitars. Singer-songwriters Madison Love and Jason DeRulo helped to co-write the penultimate song "Midnight Trip to Vegas", which also samples "Wicked Game" by Chris Isaak. The album's closing track, "The Greatest Love Story Never Told", was named after the collection of letters which Affleck had written to Lopez and also shares its name with the album's accompanying documentary.

== Critical reception ==
Professional ratings
Aggregate scores
Source	Rating
Metacritic	61/100
Review scores
Source	Rating
AllMusic	3.5/5 stars
Beats Per Minute	52%
The Daily Telegraph	3/5 stars
The Independent	3/5 stars
The Guardian	2/5 stars
Pitchfork	6.6/10
Slant Magazine	3/5 stars
HipHopDX	2.3/5 stars

This Is Me... Now received a score of 61 out of 100 on review aggregator Metacritic based on ten critics' reviews, indicating "generally positive" reception. AllMusic's Stephen Thomas Erlewine wrote that "the album is relatively streamlined and sleek, containing no guest appearances and showing no overt attempts at chasing trends." Sal Cinquemani of Slant Magazine called the album "one of Lopez's most sonically consistent efforts" and felt that certain songs "successfully capture the throwback sound of early-aughts R&B", though "most of the album falls short" of replicating the sound of This Is Me... Then. Pitchfork contributor Julianne Escobedo Shepherd commented that Lopez's "voice is stronger than ever" and "As a synergistic mythmaking effort, the album is certainly doing its job", though "the narrative threatens to, and does, overtake the music." Peter Gray of The AU Review wrote that while "so much of this album's content and enjoyment comes from her connection with Affleck [...] it's when the singer reflects on herself that we get moments of pop perfection."

The Independent's Helen Brown found that "for all her promises to show us the real her, it's a struggle to see it in the slick and sexy production", even if "she exudes the confidence of a woman who's survived the hard knocks" with "a dreamy texture to Lopez's old-school R&B". Thomas H Green of The Arts Desk reports that although "lyrical swing right" and "she acknowledges her Hispanic roots," there are two problems with the project: "the one-note theme, while sounding genuine and therapeutic, does start to wear" and that "the music sounds a bit passé" with "skittering R&B stylings of yesteryear". Neil McCormick of The Daily Telegraph described This Is Me... Now as a "competent but underpowered album of slick pop" and questions the absence of "all Latin flavouring, which might have been her superpower." Martina Rebecca Inchingolo of ABC News said Lopez "takes back her rightful place on the throne of pop music" on the album and noted her "new, refined wisdom" in comparison to its predecessor. In a less positive review for HipHopDX, Will Schube wrote that "for all of the time, money, and energy J.Lo and her team put into the theatrical accompaniment to This is Me… Now", it would have "behooved all involved to spend a little more time on the music that the film was meant to accompany", concluding that the album hears Lopez "constantly tell fans how great her love life is. She rarely bothers to explain why".

== Marketing ==
=== Promotion ===
On September 21, 2023, Lopez partnered with Apple Music for an exclusive concert at the Orpheum Theatre in Los Angeles to promote the album. A professional recording of the concert was released on February 21, 2024. On November 25, Lopez released a teaser trailer for the album, featuring clips from the upcoming music videos and/or accompanying film. Three days later, she posted the "[F]irst of many" album covers on social media.

"Can't Get Enough" was released as the lead single on January 10, 2024, with a remix featuring American rapper Latto being released on January 26. On February 3, 2024, Lopez performed the song on Saturday Night Live, where she was joined by surprise guests Latto and Redman; the latter rapping his own new verse. The album's title track was as a promotional single on February 3, 2024, after it too was performed on Saturday Night Live. Lopez released a remix to "This Time Around", featuring Korean pop group (G)I-dle on March 15, 2024.

=== This Is Me... Now: A Love Story ===
The album was released simultaneously with This Is Me... Now: A Love Story, a companion musical film directed by Dave Meyers and written by Jennifer Lopez and Matt Walton, released by Amazon Prime on February 23, 2024. On the review aggregator website Rotten Tomatoes, the film holds a 75% rating from critics.

=== The Greatest Love Story Never Told ===
The album is also accompanied by a music documentary The Greatest Love Story Never Told, released February 27, 2024. It documents the making of the album and its aforementioned music and narrative-driven film This Is Me... Now: A Love Story. The documentary stars Lopez, Affleck and actress Jane Fonda, amongst others. In the documentary, Lopez and Fonda discussed the making of the film, discussing the mechanics of Lopez's relationship with Affleck and the "examining Lopez's life as a serial romantic". Fonda said "I want you to know that I don't entirely know why, but I feel invested in you and Ben, and I really want this to work. However, this is absurd. Like, it feels too much like you're trying to prove something instead of just living it. You know, every other photograph is the two of you kissing and the two of you hugging." Lopez reassured Fonda that this "[was] just us living our life". During the documentary, Affleck appears in interviews on the set of A Love Story, one of the topics includes him asking if Lopez "ever forgave him for his actions in 2003", a reference to him breaking off their previous engagement. According to review aggregator Rotten Tomatoes, the film currently holds a 100% rating based on reviews from seven critics.

=== Cancelled tour ===
In February 2024, Lopez announced 'This Is Me... Now: The Tour', which was set to begin in June and run until August 2024. Comprising 30 shows, the tour would have visited Canada and the United States later that year, beginning on June 26 in Orlando. In March, the final seven concerts that would happen between August 22 and 30 were cancelled, with reports of logistical issues. In April, the tour was re-branded to a greatest hits tour, 'This Is Me... Live', with Variety positing that this was due to low ticket sales, while Entertainment Weekly reported that Lopez "made no changes to the planned setlist or the content of the show itself, and that the tour was always intended to be a celebration of Lopez's career", rather than just highlighting her recent album and accompanying film. Rehearsals began in May 2024 following the completion of principal photography on Lopez's scenes for the film adaptation of the stage musical version of Kiss of the Spider Woman. However, the tour was cancelled on May 31, 2024, with Lopez citing that she needed "time off to be with her children, family and close friends".

== Singles ==
The album's first single, "Can't Get Enough" was released on January 10, 2024. It was written by Lopez, Gitelman, Atia Boggs, Andrew Neely, Angel Lopez, Alton Ellis, Dennis Coffey, Chahayed, Hollis and Christopher Dotson. It samples the 1967 song "I'm Still in Love With You" by Ellis. Lopez had been teasing the song since its announcement in 2023. Lopez first teased the song when she performed it during her wedding to Affleck in August 2022. On January 2, Lopez uploaded a video to her social media where Lopez and dancer Énola Bédard danced to a mash-up of "Can't Get Enough" and "Jiggie Woogie" by Baby Lawd and D-Legend. A remix featuring rapper Latto was released on January 26.

The remix of "Rebound", featuring Puerto Rican rapper Anuel AA was released as a single on February 13, 2024. Both the solo and remix version feature on the album, while the latter only features on the deluxe edition. The solo music video for "Rebound" premiered on February 21, 2024, after featuring in This Is Me... Now: A Love Story.

== Commercial performance ==
In the United States, the album debuted at number 38 on the Billboard 200. It marked Lopez's first studio album to miss the top 20 of the chart. Pure album sales amounted to 14,000 copies (6,000 on CD, 5,000 on vinyl and digital download sales of 3,000). The album debuted at number one on the Tastemaker Albums chart and number seven on the Independent Albums charts.

The album debuted at number 55 on the UK Albums Chart and number one on the UK R&B Albums Chart.

== Track listing ==
This Is Me... Now track listing
No.	Title	Writer(s)	Producer(s)	Length
1.	"This Is Me... Now"	Jennifer Lopez; Atia Boggs; Kimberly Krysiuk; Jeff Gitelman; Rogét Chahayed; Angel Lopez; Justin Timberlake; Timothy Mosley; Scott Storch	Chahayed; A. Lopez	4:13
2.	"To Be Yours"	J. Lopez; Jessica Agombar; James Lavigne; Chahayed; A. Lopez; Andrew Wansel; Leon Russell; Bonnie Bramlett	Chahayed; A. Lopez; Pop Wansel; J. Lopez^{[a]}; Trevor Muzzy^{[a]}	3:18
3.	"Mad in Love"	J. Lopez; Melissa Storwick; Lavigne; Chahayed; A. Lopez; Wansel; Carter Lang; David Sprecher; Samuel Wishkoski	Chahayed; A. Lopez; Wansel; Lang; Yeti Beats; Sam Wish	3:06
4.	"Can't Get Enough"	J. Lopez; Boggs; Christopher Dotson; Andrew Neely; Chahayed; A. Lopez; Gitelman; Chauncey Hollis Jr.; Alton Ellis; Dennis Coffey	Chahayed; A. Lopez; Gitelman; Hit-Boy	3:06
5.	"not.going.anywhere."	J. Lopez; Boggs; Douglas Ford; Chahayed; A. Lopez; Gitelman; Ryan Martinez	Chahayed; A. Lopez; Gitelman; G-Ry	3:30
6.	"Rebound"	J. Lopez; Boggs; Jae Stephens; Chahayed; A. Lopez; Gitelman	Chahayed; A. Lopez; Gitelman	3:02
7.	"Dear Ben, Pt. II"	J. Lopez; Rachel Keen; Boggs; Chahayed; A. Lopez; Gitelman; Bernard Harvey	Chahayed; A. Lopez; Gitelman; Harv	3:39
8.	"Hummingbird"	J. Lopez; Boggs; Krysiuk; Chahayed; A. Lopez; Gitelman; Kurtis McKenzie; Wesley Singerman	Chahayed; A. Lopez; Gitelman; Kurtis McKenzie; Wes Singerman^{[a]}	2:45
9.	"Hearts and Flowers"	J. Lopez; Boggs; Alexa Boyd; Chahayed; A. Lopez; Gitelman; Uforo Ebong; David Styles; Jason Phillips; Andre Deyo; Troy Oliver; Jean-Claude Olivier; Samuel Barnes; Jose Fernando Arbex Miro; Michael Oliviere; Lawrence Parker; Scott Sterling	Chahayed; A. Lopez; Gitelman; BongoByTheWay	4:10
10.	"Broken Like Me"	J. Lopez; Boggs; Michael Pollack; Ford; Chahayed; A. Lopez; Gitelman; Federico Vindver	Chahayed; A. Lopez; Gitelman; Vindver	3:16
11.	"This Time Around"	J. Lopez; Jason Desrouleaux; Boggs; Ford; Chahayed; A. Lopez; Gitelman; Brytavious Chambers; Vindver	Chahayed; A. Lopez; Gitleman; Tay Keith; Vindver	3:55
12.	"Midnight Trip to Vegas"	J. Lopez; Desrouleaux; Boggs; Madison Love; Chahayed; A. Lopez; Gitelman; Chambers; Tyler Williams; Christopher Isaak	Chahayed; A. Lopez; Gitelman; Keith; T-Minus	3:11
13.	"Greatest Love Story Never Told"	J. Lopez; Boggs; Krysiuk; Chahayed; A. Lopez; Gitelman	Chahayed; A. Lopez; Gitelman	3:07
Total length:				44:24

Digital deluxe edition
No.	Title	Writer(s)	Producer(s)	Length
14.	"Rebound" (featuring Anuel AA)	J. Lopez; Boggs; Stephens; Chahayed; A. Lopez; Gitelman	Chahayed; A. Lopez; Gitelman	3:19
15.	"Can't Get Enough" (featuring Latto)	J. Lopez; Alyssa Stephens; Boggs; Dotson; Neely; Chahayed; A. Lopez; Gitelman; Hollis Jr.; Ellis; Coffey	Chahayed; A. Lopez; Gitelman; Hit-Boy	3:27
16.	"Can't Get Enough" (Bruno Martini remix)	J. Lopez; Boggs; Dotson; Neely; Chahayed; A. Lopez; Gitelman; Hollis Jr.; Ellis; Coffey	Chahayed; A. Lopez; Gitelman; Hit-Boy; Bruno Martini^{[a]}	2:49
Total length:				53:59

- The physical bonus edition also features a 40-page booklet of exclusive photographs plus two polaroids of Lopez.

=== This Is Me...Now commentary edition ===
- Features all thirteen songs from the standard edition
- Between each track on the original track listing, there is commentary about the song including its meaning and facts about its recording and production.

=== Notes and sample credits ===
- ^{^[a]} signifies an additional producer.
- "This Is Me... Now" contains elements of "Cry Me a River", written by Justin Timberlake, Timothy Mosley and Scott Storch, as performed by Timberlake.
- "To Be Yours" contains an interpolation of "Superstar", as written by Leon Russell and Bonnie Bramlett.
- "Can't Get Enough" contains:
  - An interpolation of "I'm Still In Love With You", as written and composed by Alton Ellis
  - Elements of "Son of a Scorpio" as written and performed by Dennis Coffey
- "Hearts and Flowers" contains an interpolation from "Jenny from the Block", as written by J. Lopez, Troy Oliver, Andre Deyo, Samuel Barnes, Jean Claude Olivier, Jose Fernando Arbex Miro, Lawrence Parker, Scott Sterling, Michael Oliver, David Styles and Jason Phillips.
- "Midnight Trip to Vegas" contains elements of "Wicked Game", written and performed by Chris Isaak.

== Personnel and credits ==
=== Recording studios ===
- Lola's Home (Beverly Hills, Los Angeles) – all songs
- Tiki Hill Studios (Dallas, Texas)
- The Mastering Palace (New York)
- Studio Z (Burbank, California)
- Henson Recording Studios (Los Angeles) – track 2 (Chaka Khan's additional vocals)
- Little Bird Studios (Los Angeles)

=== Musicians ===
- Jennifer Lopez – lead vocals, background vocals
- Ben Affleck – background vocals (track 5)
- Jessica Agombar – background vocals (track 2)
- Dougie F – background vocals (track 5)
- Faangs – background vocals (track 3)
- Jeff "Gitty" Gitelman – electric guitar (tracks 4, 5, 7–9, 12), keyboards (6), bass (8, 9), vocals (8), acoustic guitar (10, 13), piano (10), synth bass (11)
- Ink – background vocals (tracks 1, 4–6, 8, 11)
- Kaydence – background vocals (track 13)
- Chaka Khan – additional vocals (track 2)
- Angel Lopez – vocals (track 8)
- Stevie Mackey – background vocals (tracks 1, 2, 4, 7, 9, 11–13)
- Jesse McGinty – horns (track 4)
- Trevor Muzzy – background vocals (tracks 5, 13)
- Bryan Page – strings (tracks 9, 10)
- Raye – background vocals (track 7)
- Davide Rossi – strings (tracks 4, 6, 8, 10)
- Jae Stephens – background vocals (tracks 6–8, 11)
- Sidney Tipton – background vocals (tracks 2, 6)
- Rayven Tyler – background vocals (track 2)
- Sam Wishkoski – vocals (track 3)
- Ashley Woods – background vocals (track 5)

=== Technicians ===
- Chris Godbey – mixing (tracks 1, 4–6, 8, 9)
- Dave Kutch – mastering (tracks 1–
- Trevor Muzzy – mixing (tracks 2, 7, 10, 12, 13), engineering (all tracks)
- Patrizio "Teezio" Pigliapoco – mixing (tracks 3, 11)
- Ignacio Portales – engineering (tracks 3, 11)
- Ryan Prieur – engineering (tracks 1, 4–6, 8, 9
- Julian Vasquez – engineering

== Charts ==
Chart performance for This Is Me... Now
Chart (2024)	Peak position
Australian Albums (ARIA)	82
Australian Hip Hop/R&B Albums (ARIA)	23
Austrian Albums (Ö3 Austria)	6
Belgian Albums (Ultratop Flanders)	6
Belgian Albums (Ultratop Wallonia)	16
Canadian Albums (Billboard)	77
French Albums (SNEP)	38
German Albums (Offizielle Top 100)	8
Hungarian Physical Albums (MAHASZ)	32
Italian Albums (FIMI)	37
Polish Albums (ZPAV)	27
Portuguese Albums (AFP)	35
Scottish Albums (Official Charts)	14
Spanish Albums (Promusicae)	20
Swiss Albums (Schweizer Hitparade)	17
UK Albums (Official Charts)	55
UK Independent Albums (Official Charts)	5
UK R&B Albums (Official Charts)	1
US Billboard 200	38
US Independent Albums (Billboard)	7
US Indie Store Album Sales (Billboard)	1

== Release history ==
This Is Me... Now release history
Region	Date	Format	Version	Label	Ref.
Various	February 16, 2024	CD; streaming; download; LP	Standard edition	Nuyorican Productions; BMG	
Various	February 16, 2024	CD; streaming; download; LP	Bonus edition	Nuyorican Productions; BMG	
Various	February 16, 2024	Download	Commentary edition	Nuyorican Productions; BMG	

== See also ==
- List of UK R&B Albums Chart number ones of 2024
