= Marry Me (Jennifer Lopez and Maluma song) =

2022 single by Jennifer Lopez

"Marry Me (Kat & Bastian Duet)"

Single by Jennifer Lopez and Maluma

from the album Marry Me
- Released: February 2, 2022
- Length: 2:37
- Label: Universal Studios; Sony Latin
- Songwriters: Michael Pollack; Nicholas Sarazen; Olivia Waithe; Stefan Johnson; Maluma; Edgar Barrera; Jordan Johnson; Oliver Peterhof
- Producers: Pollack; The Monsters & Strangerz; Sarazen

Jennifer Lopez singles chronology
"On My Way" (2021)	"Marry Me (Kat & Bastian Duet)" (2022)	"Can't Get Enough" (2024)

Maluma singles chronology
"Cositas de la USA" (2022)	"Marry Me (Kat & Bastian Duet)" (2022)	"Mojando Asientos" (2022)

Music video
- "Marry Me" (Kat & Bastian Duet) on YouTube

"Marry Me"

Song by Jennifer Lopez and Maluma

from the album Marry Me
- Released: February 4, 2022
- Length: 2:28
- Label: Universal Studios; Sony Latin
- Songwriters: Pollack; Sarazen; Waithe; Maluma; Barrera
- Producers: Kim Burse; Kevin Teasley

Music video
- "Marry Me" (Ballad version) on YouTube

"Marry Me" is a song by American singer Jennifer Lopez and Colombian singer Maluma. It was released through Universal Studios and Sony Music Latin on February 2, 2022, as the third single from the soundtrack to the 2022 romantic comedy film of the same name. Two versions of the song were recorded: a ballad version and an uptempo version denoted as "Kat & Bastian Duet".

The ballad version was written by Michael Pollack, Nicholas Sarazen, Olivia Waithe, Maluma and Edgar Barrera and produced by Kim Burse and Kevin Teasley. The uptempo version was produced by Pollack, The Monsters & Strangerz and Sarazen and features additional writing from Stefan Johnson, Jordan Johnson and Oliver Peterhof.

== Critical reception ==
Tomás Mier of Rolling Stone called the "Kat & Bastian Duet" version of "Marry Me" an "earnworm" and said that while the lyrics are repetitive, Lopez's "sugary vocals" and its "cinematic production" make up for it. He, however, stated that the ballad version "falls flat".

== Music video ==
=== Kat & Bastian Duet ===
The music video for the "Kat & Bastian Duet" version of "Marry Me", premiered exclusively on Facebook on March 18, 2021, and later on YouTube on June 18, 2022.

=== Ballad ===
The music video for the ballad version of "Marry Me" was released on March 11, 2022. In the video, Ben Affleck makes a cameo appearance.

The bed sequence of the music video has a link to an earlier Lopez music video, "Baby I Love U!" (an Affleck-inspired song), as both music videos have a bed sequence. In 'Baby I love U' she is alone in bed and looking at the camera, but in the music video for Marry Me (Ballad) she is seen in bed alongside Affleck.

== Charts ==
=== Weekly charts ===
Chart performance for "Marry Me"
Chart (2022)	Peak position
Brazil (Top 100 Airplay)	97
Hungary (Single Top 40)	8
Mexico Airplay (Billboard)	34
Netherlands (Dutch Top 40 Tipparade)	25
UK Singles Downloads (Official Charts)	78

=== Year-end charts ===
2022 year-end chart performance for "Marry Me"
Chart (2022)	Position
Hungary (Single Top 40)	100

== Release history ==
Release dates and formats for "Marry Me"
Region	Date	Format	Version	Label	Ref.
Various	February 2, 2022	Digital download; streaming	Kat & Bastian Duet	Universal Studios; Sony Latin	
Italy	February 18, 2022	Contemporary hit radio	Kat & Bastian Duet	Sony	
