= Kayla Rae Haywood =

Australian singer and composer

- Born: Australia
- Genres: Pop, rock
- Occupations: Songwriter, singer

Kayla Rae Haywood (previously known as Ivy Adara) is an Australian retired singer and composer. Haywood has written for artists such as Selena Gomez and Hailee Steinfeld and started her career by competing in the eighth season of The X-Factor Australia.

== Early life and career ==
Haywood wrote her first song at age seven and aspired to be a musician. In 2016, Haywood joined the eighth season of The X-Factor Australia where she performed Sia's song "Alive" but did not make it past the early rounds of the show despite a standing ovation from Guy Sebastian.

After her 2016 X-Factor appearance, Haywood relocated to Los Angeles where she became a co-writer on songs for Dami Im, Natalie Conway, Jessica Mouboy, Selena Gomez, Jason DeRulo, Jennifer Lopez, Rita Ora, G-Eazy and Hailee Steinfeld. Haywood experienced a number one song on Australian iTunes with the song she wrote for Jessica Mauboy, "Fallin" which was nominated for 5 ARIA & 3 APRA awards including Song Of the Year.

In 2017, Haywood released the songs "Famous" and "Everybody Hurts (Feat. The Him)".

In 2018, Haywood released her solo EP "Intraduction" that was created in collaboration with Cirkut, Jon Hume and Lindsey Jackson. In the same year, the producer Gryffin released the song "Bye Bye" featuring Adara, who co-wrote the song. They toured together and performed it at Coachella.

In 2021, the singles "Pressure" and "Stranger" were released as part of her solo project. The latter song being inspired after a depressive period in Haywood’s life and her father flew from Sydney to LA to see her. In 2022, Haywood co-wrote two songs, “Love of My Life” and ”On My Way” for the Jennifer Lopez movie, Marry Me and its soundtrack.

In May 2025, Kayla announced on Instagram she would stop making pop music. Subsequently, all of her social media accounts were privated or deleted.

== Personal life ==
Adara was supposed to marry on August 6, 2021, but the ceremony was canceled due to the COVID-19 pandemic lockdowns.

Adara resides in Los Angeles.
