= Let Me Clear My Throat =

Single by DJ Kool

from the album Let Me Clear My Throat
- Released: April 1996
- Venue: Bahama Bay Club (Philadelphia)
- Genre: Hip hop
- Length: 4:47 (album version); 3:56 (radio edit/version)
- Label: American Recordings/Warner Bros. Blackout! 2
- Songwriters: Robert Mickens, Claydes Smith, Mark Jones, Dennis Thomas, George Brown, Allen Westfield, Mark James, John Bowman, Ronald Nathan Bell, Robert Bell
- Producers: DJ Kool, s/x, Fred Derby, Funkmaster Flex, DJ Mark the 45 King

DJ Kool singles chronology
"Let Me Clear My Throat" (1996)	"Ayo!" (2006)

"Let Me Clear My Throat" is a song by American hip-hop artist DJ Kool. It was released in April 1996 as the third and final single from his album of the same name. It was recorded live at the Bahama Bay club in Philadelphia.

== Song description ==
The most popular version of the song is the one recorded live at Bahama Bay. This version incorporates audience cheers, shouts, and participation.

The musical content of the song consists entirely of two samples: the introductory fanfare of "Hollywood Swinging" (1974) by Kool & The Gang, used in both the intro and pre-chorus, and a chopped half of "The 900 Number" (1987) by The 45 King (which itself includes a two-bar loop of the saxophone riff and drums that was sampled from "Unwind Yourself" (1968) by Marva Whitney), used in the verses and chorus.

Aside from a 16-line verse in the first half of the song, the lyrical content consists largely of audience-pleasing antics, energetic shouts, call-and-response, and shout-outs. Kool makes lyrical nods to a grittier house party history of hip-hop, dropping references from early hip-hop and soul artists such as Run DMC, James Brown, and Whistle. Likewise, the title and common line of the song, "let me clear my throat," is itself taken from the Beastie Boys' "The New Style" from 1986's Licensed to Ill.

== Other uses ==
The song was chosen as the Buffalo Sabres official goal song as part of an online fan vote on the team's official website.

The song is also used as the theme song for BBC Radio Scotland football show Off The Ball.

The song is featured in the film Office Christmas Party.

Shortly after the start of the 2023 MLB season, the Milwaukee Brewers began playing the song in conjunction with their horn at American Family Field, which is sounded after every Brewers home run. The previous song for this occasion was "Touch the Sky" by Kanye West.

== Track listing ==
1. "Let Me Clear My Throat" (Old-School Reunion Edit) – 4:25
2. "Let Me Clear My Throat" (Klassic Kool Original Version) – 4:51
3. "Let Me Clear My Throat" (Old-School Reunion Remix) – 4:53
4. "Let Me Clear My Throat" (45 King Bass 'N' Funk Remix) – 4:32
5. "Let Me Clear My Throat" (Funkmaster Flex Remix) – 3:48
6. "Let Me Clear My Throat" (No 'Damn' Old-School Reunion Remix) – 4:54
7. "Let Me Clear My Throat" (Tupac Tribute Edit) – 1:22

== Charts and certifications ==
=== Weekly charts ===
Chart (1996–1997)	Peak Position
Australia (ARIA)	50
Canada Dance (RPM)	11
Netherlands (Dutch Top 40)	7
Netherlands (Single Top 100)	10
New Zealand (Recorded Music NZ)	19
Sweden (Sverigetopplistan)	46
UK Singles (Official Charts)	8
US Billboard Hot 100	30
US Hot R&B/Hip-Hop Songs (Billboard)	21
US Rhythmic Airplay (Billboard)	28

=== Year-end charts ===
Chart (1997)	Position
Netherlands (Dutch Top 40)	75
US Billboard Hot 100	96
US Hot R&B/Hip-Hop Songs (Billboard)	64

=== Certifications ===
Region	Certification	Certified units/sales
United States (RIAA)	Platinum	1,000,000^{‡}
^{‡} Sales+streaming figures based on certification alone.
