= Can't Get Enough (Jennifer Lopez song) =

2024 single by Jennifer Lopez

Single by Jennifer Lopez

from the album This Is Me... Now
- Released: January 10, 2024
- Recorded: 2022
- Studio: Lola's House (Los Angeles)
- Genre: Pop; R&B
- Length: 3:07
- Label: Nuyorican; BMG
- Songwriters: Jennifer Lopez; Alton Ellis; Andrew Nealy; Angel Lopez; Atia Boggs; Rogét Chahayed; Dennis Coffey; Christopher "Chrishan" Dotson; Jeff "Gitty" Gitelman; Chauncey "Hit-Boy" Hollis Jr.
- Producers: Chahayed; Hit-Boy; Gitty; A. Lopez

Jennifer Lopez singles chronology
"Marry Me" (2022)	"Can't Get Enough" (2024)	"Rebound" (2024)

Latto singles chronology
"Too Fast (Pull Over)" (2023)	"Can't Get Enough" (remix) (2024)	"Sunday Service" (2024)

Music videos
- "Can't Get Enough" on YouTube; "Can't Get Enough" (remix) on YouTube

"Can't Get Enough" is a song by American singer Jennifer Lopez. It was released on January 10, 2024, by Nuyorican Productions and BMG as the lead single from her ninth studio album, This Is Me... Now (2024). The song was written by Lopez, Alton Ellis, Andrew Nealy, Angel Lopez, Atia Boggs, Rogét Chahayed, Dennis Coffey, Christopher "Chrishan" Dotson, Jeff "Gitty" Gitelman and Chauncey "Hit-Boy" Hollis Jr., with production by Chahayed, Hit-Boy, Gitty and A. Lopez. Ellis is credited for the inclusion of a sample of his 1967 single "I'm Still in Love With You" and 1977 single "Uptown Top Ranking".

The song was released alongside a wedding-themed music video featuring Lopez marrying several different grooms throughout the clip. Critics commended the video for its humorous take on Lopez's colorful love life, with warm feedback for "Can't Get Enough"'s catchy and upbeat nature and remarking that it made listeners hope for more from the album. "Can't Get Enough" spawned an official remix with rapper Latto on January 26, 2024; a second music video for the remix was released with a different theme and concept. The latter featured high-concept vignettes, including a scene with Lopez walking downtown and scenes with Latto. It drew praise for highlighting Lopez's performance abilities and for recalling her past videography. The remix is featured on the deluxe edition of This Is Me... Now. A second remix featuring Sean Paul was also released.

"Can't Get Enough" was performed live for the first time on Saturday Night Live with Latto and featured another (new) guest verse from rapper Redman. As of February 2024, the song entered the top ten of airplay charts in Argentina, Costa Rica, Chile, El Salvador, Honduras, Panama, and Nicaragua, as well as appearing on several sales and airplay charts across Canada, the UK and US.

== Background and production ==
"Can't Get Enough" and its parent album This Is Me... Now were mainly recorded between May and August 2022. During this time, Lopez also rekindled her relationship with actor Ben Affleck, commenting during an interview with Zane Lowe that the reunion had inspired her to make new music in a way not felt since her third album, This Is Me... Then (2002), when Lopez and Affleck were previously together. Lopez first teased "Can't Get Enough" when she performed it during her wedding to Affleck in August 2022. It was confirmed that further recording for the album took place up until June 29, 2023, when it was confirmed that the album was complete. On September 11, 2023, it was announced Lopez had signed a "recording and publishing partnership" deal with BMG Rights Management, in conjunction with her own Nuyorican Productions.

== Release and composition ==
"Can't Get Enough" is a pop song, with a "feel good" vibe, according to NME. Lopez wrote it alongside Andrew Nealy, Angel Lopez, Atia Boggs, Rogét Chahayed, Dennis Coffey, Christopher "Chrishan" Dotson, Jeff "Gitty" Gitelman, Chauncey "Hit-Boy" Hollis Jr., with production by Chahayed, Hit-Boy, Gitty and Angel Lopez. Alton Ellis is also credited as his 1967 song "I'm Still in Love With You" is sampled in "Can't Get Enough". Chris Méndez, writing for Forbes, stated that the song recalls the same "R&B" stylings as Lopez's music was more known for two decades previously. It features a breathy vocal style, over a beachy production according to Billboard's Gil Kaufman.

On November 27, 2023, it was confirmed that the first single from This Is Me... Now would be called "Can't Get Enough" and would be released on January 10, 2024, with album and accompanying docu-film based on the album arriving February 16, 2024. On the decision to begin the album campaign with "Can't Get Enough", Lopez said "feel like 'Can't Get Enough' is a perfect way to kind of come out of the box with this one because it does have that like my performance energy." It was released for streaming on January 10, 2024, and two days later to Italian radio stations. A remix featuring rapper Latto was released on January 26, 2024.

== Critical reception ==
Reviewers from NME and Rolling Stone called "Can't Get Enough" an "anthem" and a "catchy bop", respectively. Similarly, Vogue Arabia's Naheed Ifteqar commended the song's playful and upbeat nature, while Billboard's Gil Kaufman called the song "sexy". The New Zealand Herald praised the song's "catchy" appeal and "good beat" but their reviewer Graham Reid said they hoped the album would have more substance about the love story Lopez has promised. Exclaim! gave the song a much less favourable review, stating it continued a trend of "mediocre music", the reviewer commented on some of Lopez's previous music being demoed by other artists but stated that on "Can't Get Enough", Lopez's vocals were "compressed to conceal any similarities". The reviewer ended by calling the song forgettable, lacking in identity and personality "lost in an atrocious mix".

== Promotion ==
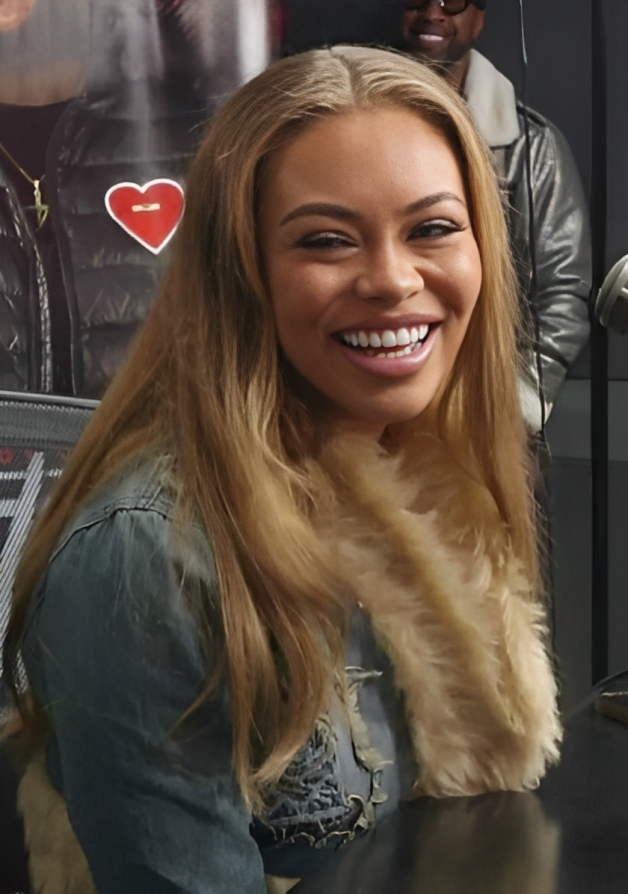
Atlanta rapper Latto (pictured) features on the remix and second music video.

Aside from performing "Can't Get Enough" live at her wedding to Affleck in August 2022, Lopez teased the single with snippets and guerrilla-style social media posts, including a video of her walking and dancing to song along with its announcement on November 27 and on January 2, a video of Lopez and Énola Bédard dancing to a mash-up of "Can't Get Enough" and "Jiggie Woogie" by Baby Lawd and D-Legend. On January 19, a Dolby Atmos commercial starring Lopez and featuring "Can't Get Enough" was released, promoting both the single and wider album's release in the Dolby sound format. The commercial was directed by Colin Tilley. On February 3, 2024, she performed the song on Saturday Night Live, where she was joined by surprise guests Latto and Redman. The latter rapped his own new verse, adding to Latto's verse on the remix. People magazine wrote that Lopez looked "every inch the pop superstar" and "showcased her impressive dancing skills" during the performance.

== Music videos ==
=== Solo version ===
The music video for the solo/original version of "Can't Get Enough" was released alongside the song on January 10, 2024, and was directed by Dave Meyers. It is wedding-inspired, which NME's Liberty Dunworth suspected came from Lopez's real-life wedding to Affleck. Speaking about the concept of the video, Lopez said "It's definitely kind of a meta story about the journey that it takes from getting from heartbreak back to love." It begins with Lopez exchanging vows in the rain and guests joking about how quickly she gets married. Throughout the visuals, the wedding is narrated by guests who joke about Lopez's inability to find love, interspersed with scenes of Lopez in a wedding dress and dancing with different grooms including professional dancers Giuseppe Giofrè, Derek Hough and actor Trevor Jackson. During the visual, Lopez wears several different wedding dresses including a "mermaid silhouette with a heart-shaped cut-out" and a second one more akin to a "minidress with voluminous skirt." Guests point out and ask the question if it's "third time lucky?", mirroring real life as Lopez has been married several times. During the bouquet-throwing portion of the wedding, a guest proclaims "Don't catch it! It's cursed." The video ends with a scene featuring Lopez in a marriage counsellor's office and being told things that various partners hate about her, including: "She doesn't listen! She thinks I'm her employee. All she cares about is work." Lopez said Affleck was involved in the making of the video, confirming she asked his opinion as no one knew her love story in real life better than him.

=== Latto remix ===
The video for the remix was directed by Tanu Muiño and was released on January 29. The video begins with Lopez being pressed by a group of reporters with questions such as "What really matters to you?", to which Lopez responds: "Love". Billboard's Gil Kaufman observed that this reflected the "arc about love addiction" in This Is Me... Now: A Love Story.

The music video begins with Lopez in a white-laced robe on a bed while staring into a mirror, before the camera follows Lopez as she heads out of the apartment. In this second scene, which Billboard compared to scenes from "Jenny from the Block", Lopez is seen in a tan suit, losing her jacket and then dancing with male dancers through traffic. The song then progresses to Latto's guest verse, as Lopez is seen under the dinner table with her man and crawling towards the camera. The guest verse scenes feature Latto and Lopez posing and dancing in red sheer dresses. For the final portion of the video scenes feature Lopez in a black thong and swimsuit showering outdoors while different men watch her from a swimming pool.

It was met with positive reception from PromoNews's Rob Ulitski, calling the video a "throwback to classic JLO from the noughties", pointing out that the clip was "glossy, ambitious spectacle, spanning multiple high-concept vignettes. Beautifully shot, art directed, edited, produced."

== Track listing ==
Digital download/streaming

1. "Can't Get Enough" – 3:07

Digital download/streaming – remix

1. "Can't Get Enough" (featuring Latto) – 3:37

Spotify single

1. "Can't Get Enough" (featuring Latto) – 3:37
2. "Can't Get Enough" – 3:07

Dance Remix

1. "Can't Get Enough" (Bruno Martini Remix) – 2:49

Dutty Remix

1. "Can't Get Enough" (Dutty Remix; featuring Sean Paul) – 3:08

== Personnel and credits ==
=== Samples and interpolations ===
- Interpolation of "I'm Still In Love With You", as written and composed by Alton Ellis
- Elements of "Son of a Scorpio" as written and performed by Dennis Coffey

=== Recording information ===
- Recorded at Lola's House in Beverly Hills, Los Angeles
- Mixed at Tiki Hill Studios, Dallas, Texas
- Mastered at The Mastering Palace, New York

Vocals

- Jennifer Lopez – lead vocals, background vocals
- Ink – background vocals
- Stevie Mackey – background vocals

Latto remix additional credits

- Latto – featured vocals
- Hit-Boy – background vocals
- Ben Hogarth – vocal recording engineer
- Javier Valverde – vocal recording engineer

Bruno Martini dance remix additional credits

- Ricardo Bonadio – engineer
- Fepy da Costa – percussion
- Laércio da Costa – percussion
- Bruno Martini – remixer, bass, drums, mixer, sound engineer, synthesizer, producer

Dutty remix additional credits

- Dale Becker – engineer
- Andre Suku Gray – vocal recording engineer
- Trebor Muzzy – mixer
- Sean Paul – featured vocals
Musicians and technicians
- Rogét Chahayed – producer
- Chauncey "Hit-Boy" Hollis – producer
- Jeff "Gitty" Gitelman – electric guitar, producer
- Chris Godbey – mixer
- David Kutch – engineer^{[a]}
- Angel Lopez – producer
- Jesse McGinty – horns
- Trevor Muzzy – engineer
- Ryan Prieur – engineer
- Davide Rossi – strings
- Julian Vasquez – engineer

Notes

- ^{^[a]} David Kutch is not credited on the Bruno Martini remix or Dutty remix

== Charts ==
Chart performance for "Can't Get Enough"
Chart (2024)	Peak position
Argentina Anglo (Monitor Latino)	3
Bolivia Anglo (Monitor Latino)	8
Canada CHR/Top 40 (Billboard)	38
Canada Hot AC (Billboard)	31
Chile Anglo (Monitor Latino)	3
Colombia Anglo (Monitor Latino)	20
Costa Rica Anglo (Monitor Latino)	3
Croatia Airplay (HRT)	21
Dominican Republic Anglo (Monitor Latino)	9
El Salvador Anglo (Monitor Latino)	5
Germany Airplay (Official Airplay Charts)	19
Honduras Anglo (Monitor Latino)	7
Japan Hot Overseas (Billboard Japan)	9
Kazakhstan Airplay (TopHit)	56
Mexico Anglo (Monitor Latino)	13
Netherlands (Tipparade)	18
Nicaragua Anglo (Monitor Latino)	5
Panama (Monitor Latino)	13
Peru Anglo (Monitor Latino)	12
San Marino (SMRRTV Top 50)	18
Slovakia Airplay (ČNS IFPI)	43
South Korea BGM (Circle)	123
UK Singles Sales (OCC)	45
US Adult Contemporary (Billboard)	27
US Adult Pop Airplay (Billboard)	14
US Pop Airplay (Billboard)	27

== Release history ==
Release dates and formats for "Can't Get Enough"
Region	Date	Format	Version	Label	Ref.
Various	January 10, 2024	Digital download; streaming	Original	Nuyorican; BMG	
Italy	January 12, 2024	Contemporary hit radio	Original	Nuyorican; BMG	
Various	January 26, 2024	Digital download; streaming	Remix featuring Latto	Nuyorican; BMG	
Various	February 9, 2024	Digital download; streaming	Bruno Martini Dance Remix	Nuyorican; BMG	
Various	April 5, 2024	Digital download; streaming	Dutty Remix; featuring Sean Paul	Nuyorican; BMG	
