= Let Me Clear My Throat (album) =

Studio album by DJ Kool
- Released: April 23, 1996
- Recorded: 1995–1996
- Genre: Hip hop; go-go
- Length: 34:32
- Label: American/Warner Bros. 43105
- Producer: DJ Kool; S/X

DJ Kool chronology
| 20 Minute Workout (1994) | Let Me Clear My Throat (1996) |

Professional ratings
Review scores
| Source | Rating |
|---|---|
| AllMusic | 4.5/5 stars |
| Robert Christgau | (3-star Honorable Mention) |
| Muzik | 5/10 |
| NME | 8/10 |

Let Me Clear My Throat is the third and final studio album by DJ Kool, released in April 1996 on American Recordings. Let Me Clear My Throat was DJ Kool's most successful album chart-wise, becoming his only one to reach the Billboard 200, where it peaked at 161. The album is best remembered for its title track, "Let Me Clear My Throat", which became Kool's only top-40 hit and reached gold certification for sales of over 500,000 copies. "I Got Dat Feelin'," which sampled Naughty by Nature's "Uptown Anthem", also made it to the Billboard charts.

== Track listing ==
1. "I'm Not from Philly" – 0:34
2. "Let Me Clear My Throat" (Live) – 4:47
3. "I Got Dat Feelin'" – 6:45
4. "Put That Hump (In Your Back)" – 6:11
5. "Music Ain't Loud Enuff" – 2:50
6. "Twenty Minute Work-Out" – 8:07
7. "Let Me Clear My Throat" (Old School Reunion Remix '96) – 4:53 (featuring Biz Markie and Doug E. Fresh)
8. "I'm Done" – 0:16

== Charts ==
=== Weekly charts ===
| Chart (1996) | Peak position |
|---|---|
| US Billboard 200 | 161 |
| US Heatseekers Albums (Billboard) | 8 |
| US Top R&B/Hip-Hop Albums (Billboard) | 21 |

=== Year-end charts ===
| Chart (1996) | Position |
|---|---|
| US Top R&B/Hip-Hop Albums (Billboard) | 94 |
