= Marry Me (soundtrack) =

- Digital cover

Soundtrack album by Jennifer Lopez and Maluma
- Released: February 4, 2022
- Recorded: 2019
- Genres: Pop; reggaeton; R&B
- Length: 34:05
- Languages: English; Spanish
- Labels: Universal Studios; Sony Latin
- Producers: Arkadi; Edgar Barrera; Tommy Brown; Kim Burse; Leroy Clampitt; Danja; John Debney; Dalton Diehl; Steve Franks; German; Johnny Goldstein; Keith Hetrick; Jon Leone; M-Phazes; Steve Mackey; Skyler Mones; Trevor Muzzy; Nyal; Michael Pollack; Nicholas Sarazen; Kevin Teasley; The Monsters & Strangerz; Noel Zancanella

Jennifer Lopez chronology
A.K.A. (2014)	Marry Me (2022)	This Is Me... Now (2024)

Maluma chronology
Papi Juancho (2020)	Marry Me (2022)	The Love & Sex Tape (2022)

John Debney chronology
American Underdog (2021)	Marry Me (2022)	Luck (2022)

Singles from Marry Me
- 1. "Pa' Ti" Released: September 24, 2020; 2. "On My Way" Released: November 18, 2021; 3. "Marry Me" Released: February 2, 2022

Marry Me is the soundtrack album to the 2022 film of the same name, performed by its stars Jennifer Lopez and Maluma. It was released on February 4, 2022, by Universal Studios and Sony Music Latin, marking Lopez's first full-length release since A.K.A. (2014) and Maluma's first since Papi Juancho (2020).

The soundtrack was nominated at the 13th Hollywood Music in Media Awards in the Soundtrack Album category. The Marry Me Live Concert Special was also nominated in the Live Concert for Visual Media category.

== Background and development ==
While promoting her single "Medicine" in April 2019, Lopez told Ebro Darden of Beats 1 radio that the next album she releases will "probably be with a new movie". Later that same month, it was announced that she would be starring alongside Owen Wilson in the romantic comedy, Marry Me (2022). In July 2019, Colombian singer Maluma was cast to play Lopez's fiancé in the film. During their first week of shooting, on October 5, 2019, Lopez and Maluma performed her song "No Me Ames" during his show at Madison Square Garden in New York City. In February 2020, Lopez announced that she would be releasing a new album alongside Marry Me that would also serve as the film's soundtrack. She told Jimmy Fallon during an interview that the album would feature "six or eight" songs performed by herself and "two or three" songs performed by Maluma, as well as a duet between the two that is performed as both an uptempo and a ballad.

== Writing and recording ==
After receiving the script for Marry Me, Lopez and her team started finding places in the film where they could place music. According to the singer, "you can't have a movie about two pop stars who are performing and not have a soundtrack". While on the It's My Party tour during the summer of 2019, she listened to 100 songs submitted by different writers and producers and narrowed it down to "seven or eight" songs to be featured in the film. The process of creating the soundtrack was "really difficult" for Lopez due to the fact that she wasn't making a "J.Lo album" and was instead "writing songs for the story", noting that she was on tour during the writing and recording process.

After signing onto the project, Maluma started writing songs with his long-time producer Edgar Barrera. The first song they wrote was "Segundo", which was met with positive reception from the studio and director. The "R&B-tinged pop" song features an "earworm finger-snapping beat", and lyrics where Maluma asks their lover for a second chance After being asked to do "another, more commercial reggaeton song", Maluma and Barrera wrote a second song called "Uno en un Millón". "Uno en un Millón" ("1 in a Million") fuses "raggeaton drums with pop beats." In similar vein, "Pa Ti (For You)" is another downtempo reggaeton song. Later on "Church" Lopez creates a "non-typical church song" which would "get the party started". Billboard staff called the song "gospel-infused pop". Other songs include "Love of My Life" which centres on finding love from oneself first and features some acapella vocals by Lopez, and the acoustic guitar-driven song "After Love (Part 1)". On the latter, Lopez sings about failed relationships but the inclusion of EDM beats makes you "dance your sorrows away" according to Billboard staff.

== Critical reception ==
Professional ratings
Review scores
Source	Rating
AllMusic	3.5/5 stars
Rolling Stone	3.5/5 stars

Matt Collar of AllMusic rated the album three and a half out of five stars, writing that "the soundtrack is filled with a bevy of pop anthems, ballads, as well as reggaeton and club tracks" fitting the characters played in the film well. TheWrap pointed out that the soundtrack and the film were made for "promoting Lopez's music, [...] a goal built into the equation emerges in the indistinguishability of the stock score from countless other, similar movies". Reviewing the film, Nick Levine of NME was less impressed by the soundtrack, writing that "the original songs are so boring you'll find yourself wishing Kat would just bash out "On the Floor" instead".

According to Tomás Mier of Rolling Stone, "Jennifer Lopez and Maluma Have Real Musical Chemistry on the 'Marry Me' Soundtrack". He also added "Though lyrically shallow, and unsurprisingly so, the LP aids Marry Me's storyline with its themes of longing, love-building, and deception. Maluma doesn't take many risks, but he still delivers when he sticks to his known reggaeton tricks. For her part, Lopez owns the album's ballads and bops — flashing her musical prowess and versatility at every turn." Holly Alvarado of Remezcla said that "Throughout the 13 tracks, its entirety is about the rigid ideals of finding love. And even if we hate to admit it, everything in life is guiding us to it, being the film's core theme." She also added that "Each song is a hit. Even though the record is only 37 minutes short, it's loaded with tender melodies that make the film a uniquely produced rom-com for the year."

== Singles ==
On September 21, 2020, Lopez and Maluma posted a 15-second teaser on both of their respective social media accounts to announce that they would be releasing a "two-song" collaboration, called "Pa' Ti + Lonely", on September 24, 2020. While both songs were originally announced to be featured on the Marry Me soundtrack, "Lonely" did not end up making the final cut. "Pa' Ti" marked Lopez's highest chart debut in the United States since 2017, debuting at number nine on Billboard's Hot Latin Songs for the chart dated October 10, 2020. It became Lopez's highest entry on the chart since her feature on "Adrenalina" (2014), as well as her seventh top-ten song and Maluma's 13th. "On My Way", the second single from the album, was released on November 18, 2021, alongside the trailer for the film. "Marry Me", the title track, was released as the third and final single. Two versions of the song were released - a ballad version and an uptempo version denoted as "Kat & Bastian Duet".

== Track listing ==
Standard edition
No.	Title	Writer(s)	Performer(s)	Length
1.	"Here Comes the Bride"	John Debney; Richard Wagner	Coolidge Crew	0:45
2.	"Marry Me" (Kat & Bastian Duet)	Maluma; Edgar Barrera; Michael Pollack; Oliver Peterhof; Jordan Johnson; Stefan Johnson; Nicholas Sarazen; Olivia Waithe	Jennifer Lopez; Maluma	2:37
3.	"Pa' Ti (For You)"	Maluma; Barrera; Jennifer Lopez; Janée Bennett; Nathaniel Campany; Jon Leone; Andrea Mangiamarchi	Jennifer Lopez; Maluma	3:50
4.	"Church"	Jenna Andrews; Bekuh Boom; Floyd Hills; William Larsen; Moses Sumney; Elle Varner	Jennifer Lopez	2:50
5.	"1 en 1 Millón"	Maluma; Barrera; Vicente Barco; Johany Correa	Maluma	2:40
6.	"Love of My Life"	Ivy Adara; Peterhof; Johnson; Johnson; Nicholas Gale; Dallas Koehlke; Ryan Ogren; Theron Thomas	Jennifer Lopez	3:12
7.	"After Love" (Part 1)	Daniel Henig; Kyle Moorman; Lisa Scinta	Jennifer Lopez	2:45
8.	"Marry Me" (Ballad)	Maluma; Barrera; Pollack; Sarazen; Waithe	Jennifer Lopez; Maluma	3:33
9.	"Segundo"	Maluma; Barrera; Barco; Tommy Brown; Steven Franks	Maluma	2:28
10.	"On My Way"	Pollack; Adara; Leroy Clampitt	Jennifer Lopez	3:12
11.	"Nobody's Watching (Marry Me)"	Ale Alberti; Dalton Diehl; Jeff Shum	Jennifer Lopez	2:56
Total length:				34:05

Bonus track
No.	Title	Writer(s)	Performer(s)	Length
12.	"Love of My Life" (Arkadi Remix)	Adara; Peterhof; Johnson; Johnson; Gale; Koehlke; Ogren; Thomas	Jennifer Lopez	3:17
Total length:				37:43

Digital and Target bonus track
No.	Title	Writer(s)	Performer(s)	Length
13.	"On My Way (Marry Me)" (Telykast Remix)	Pollack; Adara; Clampitt	Jennifer Lopez	3:38
Total length:				37:43

Target bonus track
No.	Title	Writer(s)	Performer(s)	Length
14.	"After Love" (Part 2)	Henig; Moorman; Scinta	Jennifer Lopez	3:09
Total length:				40:52

== Credits and personnel ==
=== Personnel ===
- Steve Mackey – Vocal production (all tracks)
- Trevor Muzzy – Vocal production (all tracks)
- Edgar Barrera – Production (3, 5, 9)
- The Monsters & Strangerz – Production (2, 12)
- M-Phazes – Production (7, 14)
- Keith Hetrick – Production (10, 13)
- Kim Burse – Assistant production (1); Production (8)
- Michael Pollack – Production (2); Additional production (10)
- John Debney – Production (1)
- Nicholas Sarazen – Production (2)
- Jon Leone – Production (3)
- Danja – Production (4)
- Nyal – Production (5)
- Skylar Mones – Production (6)
- Johnny Goldstein – Co-production (6)
- Noel Zancanella – Co-production (6)
- Kevin Teasley – Production (8)
- Tommy Brown – Production (9)
- Steven Franks – Production (9)
- Dalton Diehl – Production (11)
- Arkadi – Production (12)
- German – Production (12)
- Jeff Shum – Co-production (11)
- Julio Copello – Additional production (8)
- Leroy Clampitt – Additional production (10)

=== Recording locations ===
- 9000 (Los Angeles, California)
- Art House (Miami, Florida)
- Barbara McLean Mixing (Los Angeles, California)
- Dream Asylum (Hallandale Beach, Florida)
- Grundman Mastering (Los Angeles, California)
- Hit23 (Miami, Florida)
- Hummingbird Hill (Spring Hill, Tennessee)
- Igloo (Burbank, California)
- La Casa De Juancho (Medellín, Colombia)
- M&S (Sherman Oaks, California)
- Mastering Place (New York City, New York)
- Mixstar (Virginia Beach, Virginia)
- Newman Scoring Stage (Los Angeles California)
- Patriot (Los Angeles, California)
- SafeHouseSound (Franklin, Tennessee)
- TLM (Los Angeles, California)
- Tone Room (New Boston, Michigan)

== Charts ==
Chart performance for Marry Me
Chart (2022)	Peak position
Australian Albums (ARIA)	90
Belgian Albums (Ultratop Wallonia)	132
Spanish Albums (Promusicae)	90
UK Album Downloads (Official Charts)	40
UK Soundtrack Albums (Official Charts)	6
US Billboard 200	135
US Soundtrack Albums (Billboard)	5

== Release history ==
Release dates and formats for Marry Me
Region	Date	Format	Label	Ref.
France	February 4, 2022	CD; digital download; streaming	Sony Music Latin	
Poland	February 4, 2022	CD	Sony	
United Kingdom	February 4, 2022	CD; digital download; streaming	Relentless	
United States	February 4, 2022	CD; digital download; streaming	Sony Music Latin	
Canada	February 18, 2022	CD	Sony	
