= The Music Ain't Loud Enuff =

Studio album by DJ Kool
- Released: 1990
- Recorded: 1988–1990
- Studio: Funky Ned's Basement
- Genre: Hip hop
- Length: 50:03
- Label: SOH Music; Creative Funk
- Producer: DJ Kool; Funky Ned

DJ Kool chronology
The Music Ain't Loud Enuff (1990)	20 Minute Workout (1994)

Professional ratings
Review scores
Source	Rating
AllMusic	4/5 stars
Robert Christgau	(3-star Honorable Mention)

The Music Ain't Loud Enuff is the debut album by DJ Kool, released in 1990. The album contains 18 tracks, including the title song, which was originally released by Creative Funk Records as a single in 1988.

== Track listing ==
No.	Title	Length
1.	"We Been Waiting"	0:46
2.	"Music Ain't Loud Enuff"	5:31
3.	"Kool and the Godfather"	0:23
4.	"I Can Make You Dance" (featuring Jacques Mariage)	4:51
5.	"Word to Marcus Garvey"	0:15
6.	"How Low Can You Go"	3:49
7.	"Just for the House Nation"	1:01
8.	"House Your Body"	4:38
9.	"For Rostine Only"	0:29
10.	"Pressed Against the Glass" (featuring DJ Renegade)	5:03
11.	"Music Ain't Loud Enuff"	4:52
12.	"The Raggamuffin Style"	0:28
13.	"Raggae Dance" (featuring Brother Nitemare)	5:34
14.	"Koolin with Flavor"	0:13
15.	"What the Hell You Come in Here For"	4:37
16.	"Word to Malcolm X"	0:35
17.	"Get On Down and Party"	6:13
18.	"Thanks for Listening"	0:45
Total length:		50:03
