= Prymary Colorz =

American R&B group

- Origin: Charlotte, North Carolina; Tampa, Florida
- Genres: Hip-hop, R&B, Pop
- Years active: 2000 – 2004
- Label: Big 3 Records
- Past members: Marcus Dilley; Jonathan Thomas; Raj Nichols; Josh Royals

Prymary Colorz was an interracial R&B music group. The group was composed of members Marcus Dilley, Jonathan Thomas, Raj Nichols and Josh Royals.

The group released one album, If You Only Knew with producers like Rodney Jerkins, John and Dino Elephante, Robin Thicke, and featuring guest singer such as Vickie Winans; its title track peaked at #1 on the Billboard Hot Singles Sales chart and #78 on the Billboard Hot 100 chart. It has been their most successful single to date.

During 2002, Prymary Colorz opened for Swedish pop group A-Teens on their Pop 'til You Drop! tour, and appeared in concert with R&B singer Mario in December of that same year.

At this time they performed with artists such as Ashanti, Sean Paul, CeeLo Green, and Rick Derringer, opened up for Jay Leno, and presented a Gospel Music Award to Kirk Franklin alongside Marvin Sapp.

In addition to this they performed on various television shows such as Soul Train with Nelly and The Jenny Jones Show.

In 2003, they contributed to the song "My Perfect Friend" from the "Macho Man" Randy Savage studio album, Be a Man.

The group disbanded in 2004.

== Discography ==
=== Albums ===
- 2002: If You Only Knew #61 U.S. R&B Albums

=== Singles ===
Year	Song	U.S. R&B	U.S. Singles Sales	Album
2002	"If You Only Knew" (featuring Rah Digga)	78	4	If You Only Knew
