= This Is Me... Now: A Love Story =

2024 film by Dave Meyers

- Release poster
- Directed by: Dave Meyers
- Written by: Jennifer Lopez; Matt Walton
- Story by: Jennifer Lopez; Dave Meyers; Chris Shafer
- Produced by: Jennifer Lopez; Nathan Scherrer
- Starring: Jennifer Lopez; Fat Joe; Kim Petras; Keke Palmer; Post Malone; Sofía Vergara; Jenifer Lewis; Jay Shetty; Neil deGrasse Tyson; Sadhguru; Derek Hough; Trevor Noah; Ben Affleck
- Cinematography: Scott Cunningham
- Edited by: Adam Petrofsky
- Music by: Lenny Wee
- Production companies: Nuyorican Productions; Amazon MGM Studios; Freenjoy
- Distributed by: Amazon Prime Video
- Release dates: February 13, 2024 (Dolby Theatre); February 16, 2024 (United States)
- Running time: 65 minutes
- Country: United States
- Language: English

This Is Me... Now: A Love Story is a 2024 American romantic drama musical film and visual accompaniment to Jennifer Lopez's ninth studio album, This Is Me... Now (2024). Directed by Dave Meyers and written by Lopez and Matt Walton, based on the story Lopez, Meyers and Chris Shafer conceived, This Is Me... Now: A Love Story stars Lopez alongside an ensemble cast featuring Jane Fonda, Fat Joe, Kim Petras, Keke Palmer, Post Malone, Sofía Vergara, Jenifer Lewis, Jay Shetty, Neil deGrasse Tyson, Sadhguru, Derek Hough, Trevor Noah and Ben Affleck as the Biker.

This Is Me... Now: A Love Story is stylized around a fictional narrative inspired by Lopez's marriage to Affleck and events over the previous twenty years of her life and career. The film is a component of a three-part multimedia project produced by Lopez, which she self-funded at a cost of around $20 million, when funding fell through at the 11th hour. The nature of the film and the funding was explored during part three of the multimedia project, the documentary, The Greatest Love Story Never Told, where it was revealed that the original studio involved with This Is Me... Now: A Love Story did not understand or have confidence in its direction.

The official trailer for This Is Me... Now: A Love Story was released on January 17, 2024, and sparked a polarizing media discourse; some journalists felt "confused" by the plot, while others commended its unconventional approach to musical films. The film premiered at the Dolby Theatre in Los Angeles on February 13, 2024, and was released worldwide alongside its parent album on February 16 via Amazon Prime Video. It received positive reviews from critics, most of whom admired the production design, cinematography, Lopez's performance, and the film's "chaotic" ambition, although some found it to be nothing more than a commercial for its companion album.

== Plot ==
Alida and Taroo, an ancient Puerto Rican legend about two star-crossed lovers from feuding tribes, has greatly influenced Artist's opinions on love and romance. She reflects on their story in a dream where she finds herself enjoying a motorcycle ride with her biker lover. Suddenly, the two suffer a severe crash that leaves Artist's heart ruptured. With the help of factory workers, she attempts to prevent her heart from breaking by using the age-old myth as a central guide, but to no avail ("Hearts and Flowers").

Now in the present, Artist shares her dream with her therapist. He finds her dreams to be eccentric, which she blames on the conflicting astrological signs between him and his wife. The therapist moves on to discuss Artist's abusive relationship with a Libra; she is convinced by astrology that they are a good fit, but her friends are concerned for her well-being ("Rebound"). She leaves him for good following a heated argument that grows violent, while the Zodiacal Council, composed of 10 of the 12 astrological signs, questions the origin of her poor romantic decisions. Before they could piece together an answer, Artist enters three unsuccessful marriages with a Pisces, a Virgo, and a Cancer, respectively ("Can't Get Enough").

The Zodiacal Council is alarmed by how quickly Artist is going through her relationships, as well as by the gossip that is emerging as a result. They conclude that in order for her to break her romantic cycle, she must rise above her physical self by embarking on a self-love journey without their assistance. While Artist continues with her ill-advised lifestyle, her friends stage an intervention. They believe that she might be a sex addict, which she quickly denies by criticizing their own romantic choices. In therapy, she defends her reputation as a hopeless romantic until the therapist interrupts her for time. Before Artist leaves, he recommends that she contacts Love Addicts Anonymous; she is hesitant at first, but eventually joins a group session and shares her story ("Broken Like Me").

Artist returns home and burns old love letters and childhood memories while a hummingbird, found in Alida and Taroo, furiously knocks on her window. As she leaves in the morning for a therapy session, Mike, a member of her friend group, invites her to his wedding; given his cynical take on love, the invitation bewilders her. During her session, she tells the therapist about a dream she recently had that follows her through their childhood neighborhood in the Bronx. She encounters a younger version of herself and apologizes through tears for abandoning their needs, causing her heart to be fully restored ("This Is Me... Now"). With a new lease on life, Artist attends Mike's wedding alone and encounters several hummingbirds that lead her to her true love ("Midnight Trip to Vegas", "Hummingbird").

== Cast ==
Adapted from CNN.

- Jennifer Lopez as the Artist
- Ben Affleck as Rex Stone / Biker
- Fat Joe as Therapist
- Alex West as Luis
- Tony Bellissimo as Husband #1
- Derek Hough as Husband #2
- Trevor Jackson as Husband #3
- Paul Raci as Group Leader
- Bella Gagliano as Little Jenny
- Brandon Delsid as the Lover
- Ashley Versher as the Idealist
- Malcolm Kelner as the Realist
- Alix Angelis as the Quiet One
- Danielle Larracuente as the Fighter
- Matthew Law as The Cynic / Mike
- Gilbert Saldiva as Abusive Libra
- Jay Shetty as Aries
- Neil deGrasse Tyson as Taurus
- Jenifer Lewis as Gemini
- Sofía Vergara as Cancer
- Post Malone as Leo
- Kim Petras as Virgo
- Trevor Noah as Libra
- Keke Palmer as Scorpio
- Jane Fonda as Sagittarius
- Sadhguru as Pisces

== Background and production ==
According to Lopez, the film has a humorous tone, saying "not that this [A Love Story] is anything close to a romantic comedy, but those moments for me are the ones in life that show you how important it is to be able to laugh at yourself. You have to, because it's absurd sometimes the things that you find yourself in or that you go through. You think, "I never thought I would be this person." According to Nuyorican Productions, the film went overbudget and this was challenging to Lopez self-financing the project. A number of celebrities were approached to star in the film; Khloe Kardashian turned it down.

"I wanted to do something different. So we embarked upon how to do that in a visual way with singing, dancing and funny in a life-like way."

— Lopez explaining A Love Story's concept to The Hollywood Reporter.

According to Lopez, early in the album's production, a $30 million deal for the project was pulled. As told by Benny Medina in the accompanying documentary, an "on paper" deal was pulled, with Medina relaying what was told to him: "they were blown away by [Lopez]; uh, you know, the dynamic in the room; [they] thought that there was too much that was being bitten off, uh, the quality was gonna be potentially compromised." Lopez debated just filming a single video and before ultimately deciding to do the full visual companion (This Is Me Now... A Love Story); in the end, the project was self-financed. Lopez's production partner Elaine Goldsmith-Thomas thought she was crazy to self-finance the project but understood the importance of the story to both Lopez and the album. The script was written by Lopez's husband, actor Ben Affleck, Matt Walton, Dave Meyers (who also directed it) and Chris Shafer. According to Lopez, once the album was complete it felt special and "like a moment" so "throwing a video out" did not feel right. She called Meyers to play him and sing him some of the music. She said "I told him that I made this album 20 years ago, and now we're here". Meyers reported to want to tell the story of Affleck and Lopez's rekindled romance but instead Lopez wanted a story based on their love but not a biographical mirror of her lovelife.

Contrary to many media reports, This Is Me.. Now: A Love Story is not about Lopez's relationship with Affleck. The album and the film are about Lopez learning to love herself.

== Release and promotion ==
Affleck features in some of the scenes. A teaser for the project was unveiled, featuring a snippet of the album's title track. The official trailer was released on January 17, 2024. Commenting on the trailer, Tim Jonze from the Guardian remarked that Lopez's approach to a film accompanying her album differed from her peers Taylor Swift (The Eras Tour) and Beyoncé (Renaissance), both of which were concert films. Instead, Jonze posed that Lopez was instead inventing a new genre of music films, the "therapy-musical biopic", noting that Lopez's approach comes from a different place as her career had revolved around music and films from the start; it was also noted that although Affleck stars in the film, Lopez "plays a strange version of herself" suggesting that the film's protagonist is based somewhat on Lopez's life. This was confirmed during an interview with the AU Review, where the film was described as semi-biographical and "stylized and fictionalized".

The film reached the number one spot on Amazon Prime Video in numerous countries such as the United States, Belize, Cambodia, Georgia, Jordan, Latvia and Tanzania. It appeared in the Top 10 list in over 30 countries.

== Critical response ==
Metacritic review
breakdown (unweighted)

Positive
10 (50%)
Mixed
10 (50%)
Negative
0 (0%)

The film was met with generally positive reviews from critics. On the review aggregator website Rotten Tomatoes, 75% of 55 critics' reviews are positive, with an average rating of 6.4/10. The website's consensus reads: "An extravagant ode to the titular emotion, This Is Me... Now: A Love Story is an over-the-top delight for fans seeking a dose of J.Lo at her most earnest and unrestrained." Metacritic, which uses a weighted average, assigned the film a score of 61 out of 100, based on 20 critics, indicating "generally favorable" reviews.

Robbie Collin of The Daily Telegraph was positive, describing the film as "bonkers" but noting: "What's most exciting about it, though, is that behind the lunacy, so much of it works." Collin found Lopez's performance "endlessly watchable". Coleman Spilde of The Daily Beast characterized it as a "Marvel-grade spectacle" and "Beyoncé's Lemonade for ivory tower romantics", adding: "Lopez is aiming for relatable, not insightful. By doing this, she becomes the everywoman, an antithesis of Beyoncé's unattainable perfection." Writing for Entertainment Weekly, Kristen Baldwin wrote: "A curious blend of Hallmark movie, music video, and self-help seminar, Love Story is enjoyably bizarre and will serve as a fun fling for die-hard Lopez fans." Tom Gliatto from People magazine described the film as "a pull-out-all-the-stops musical — wildly, deliriously ornate — that sweeps us through a string of extravagant fantasy numbers, all of them showcasing the album’s infectious songs". Johnny Oleksinski of New York Post described the "tell-all musical flick" as "bonkers", in which "the star is really Lopez’s brain, and how she earnestly determined that the best way to tell the story of the past thirty years would be to have Kim Petras and Post Malone play talking constellations." Courtney Howard of The A.V. Club was positive, calling the film a "deeply personalized work of artistic bravura" and a "genuinely moving, absurdist autobiography of a dynamic persona in flux that's as campy as it is charming" and "preposterous as it is profound." Louis Staples of BBC noted that "the most interesting thing about This Is Me... Now: A Love Story is its format and the creative control it has given Lopez," and that "[Lopez] is ensuring she finally gets her flowers" after being "frequently overlooked throughout her career."

In a less positive review, Benjamin Lee of The Guardian wrote that the film "it's not really much of anything in the end, and feels most like a stitched together collection of pre-filmed awards show bits", describing the film as a "bizarro trainwreck the trailer might have suggested". Kate Erbland of IndieWire found "J.Lo's love letter to romance is too glossy and bizarre to ever get to the heart of the matter", calling it a "a 65-minute music video" rather than a film.
