= Baila Conmigo (Jennifer Lopez song) =

Single by Jennifer Lopez
- Language: Spanish
- English title: "Dance with Me"
- Released: October 10, 2019
- Genre: Dance; EDM
- Length: 2:43
- Label: Nuyorican; Sony Latin
- Songwriters: Jennifer Lopez; Kelly Paola Ruiz Moncada; Servando Primera; Víctor Alonso Cárdenas Ospina; David Sanchez Gonzalez
- Producers: David Sanchez aka Dayvi; Luis Barrera Jr.; Servando Primera; Víctor Cárdenas

Jennifer Lopez singles chronology
"Medicine" (2019)	"Baila Conmigo" (2019)	"Pa' Ti + Lonely" (2020)

Audio video
- "Baila Conmigo" on YouTube

"Baila Conmigo" is a song recorded by American singer Jennifer Lopez. It was written by Lopez, Kelly Paola Ruiz Moncada, Servando Primera, Víctor Alonso Cárdenas Ospina and David Sanchez Gonzalez. The song was inspired by the track by the same name by Colombian producers Dayvi y Víctor Cárdenas, which was a viral phenomenon in Latin America. The song marks the singer's first Spanish-language single since 2018's Bad Bunny-assisted "Te Guste", and is a high-energy dance number with heavy Latin influences.

== Composition and lyrics ==
Produced by Servando Primera, David Sánchez, Victor Cárdenas and Luis Barrera, "Baila Conmigo" is a Spanish-language dance and EDM track with lyrics are about wanting to spend a special night at the beach dancing until the sunrise. According to a rough translation, the song begins with Lopez asking her lover to "imagine me and you on the beach" with "the sand, the ocean, the sound of the waves" setting the scene for a romantic union. She goes on to fantasize about “traveling all over your body", begging her partner to "kiss me, touch me, and dance with me" before they "touch heaven" with their hands and glue their mouths together. She also sings: "Dale que dale mas duro que la música rompe los muros que solo bailando me curo/ Baila Conmigo" (Do it hard because music breaks barriers and only dancing I heal/ Dance with me).

== Chart performance ==
"Baila Conmigo" debuted at number 16 on Billboard's Hot Dance/Electronic Songs chart, collecting 724,000 domestic streams while selling just over 1,000. The track also opened on the Latin Digital Song Sales (No. 3), Dance/Electronic Digital Song Sales (No. 5) and the Latin Pop Songs airplay charts (No. 36). On February 21, 2020, the song topped the Billboard Dance Charts, becoming Lopez’ 18th number one single on the chart.

== Live performance ==
Lopez first performed "Baila Conmigo" during her set at the iHeartRadio Fiesta Latina on November 2, 2019.

== Critical reception ==
Elias Leight of Rolling Stone reviewed the song as "a brassy, hard-driving club record." He added that Lopez "sings stern, rapid-fire lines over the track’s martial horns." Joey Nolfi of EW Entertainment also called the song a "fiery Spanish song."

== Credits and personnel ==
Credits adapted from Tidal.

- Jennifer Lopez – songwriter, vocals
- Kelly Paola Ruiz Moncada – songwriter
- Servando Primera – songwriter, producer
- Víctor Cárdenas – songwriter, producer
- David Sanchez aka Dayvi – songwriter, producer
- Luis Barrera Jr. – producer

== Charts ==
=== Weekly charts ===
Weekly chart performance for "Baila Conmigo"
Chart (2019–2020)	Peak position
Honduras Pop (Monitor Latino)	6
Mexico Espanol Airplay (Billboard)	28
US Dance Club Songs (Billboard)	1
US Hot Dance/Electronic Songs (Billboard)	16
US Latin Airplay (Billboard)	37
Venezuela (Monitor Latino)	19

=== Year-end charts ===
2020 year-end chart performance for "Baila Conmigo"
Chart (2020)	Position
Honduras Airplay (Monitor Latino)	69
US Hot Dance/Electronic Songs (Billboard)	61

== Certifications ==
Certifications for "Baila Conmigo"
Region	Certification	Certified units/sales
United States (RIAA)	Platinum (Latin)	60,000^{‡}
^{‡} Sales+streaming figures based on certification alone.

== See also ==
- List of Billboard number-one dance songs of 2020
