= Be a Man (Randy Savage album) =

Studio album by Randy Savage
- Released: October 7, 2003
- Recorded: 2003
- Genre: Hip hop
- Length: 45:53
- Label: Big3 Records
- Producer: Da Raskulls

Be a Man is the only studio album by American professional wrestler "Macho Man" Randy Savage. It was released on October 7, 2003 by Big3 Records. The song "Perfect Friend" was written as a tribute to "Mr. Perfect" Curt Hennig, while the title track is a diss song aimed at Hulk Hogan.

== Recording and release ==
Savage was offered the opportunity to record Be a Man after meeting Bill Edwards, the chairman of St. Petersburg, Florida-based Big3 Records. The label's in-house production team, Da Raskulls, wrote and produced the album; Savage is credited as co-composer of "Be a Man" and his brother, Lanny Poffo, wrote the lyrics of "Perfect Friend."

In a 2003 interview, Savage said his feud with Hulk Hogan, the subject of the title track, was genuine, and that his entry into music was earnest. "I'm just trying to have fun, but I can't stress enough that this isn't a novelty act. I'm in this for the long haul," Savage said.

In 2023, the album was released as vinyl LP for the first time as a Record Store Day exclusive.

== Reception ==
Professional ratings
Review scores
| Source | Rating |
|---|---|
| AllMusic | 1/5 stars |
| RapReviews | 4/10 |
| Sputnikmusic | 1/5 stars |

Be a Man sold approximately 15,000 copies. Though the album was critically panned, it did receive some tongue-in-cheek reviews with hyperbolic praise. The Good 5¢ Cigar, the student newspaper of the University of Rhode Island, wrote that Be a Man would "change not only the entire music industry, but your life as you know it. Every song on [the album] is better than any other song you've heard in your life." Ernest A. Jasmin of The News Tribune said Savage is "the epitome of [a] renaissance man", and that his rapping is "way better than Shaquille O'Neal's." Tom Mallon of CMJ New Music Monthly said Savage's flow is "surprisingly tight for a middle-aged, musclebound beef jerky salesman with an audible constipation problem."

== Track listing ==
All tracks are produced by Big K, Brian O, Ted Howard, and Jerome Jefferson, with co-production by Guy Walker on "Feel the Madness" and Osinachi Nwaneri on "Gonna Be Trouble".

| No. | Title | Writer(s) | Length |
|---|---|---|---|
| 1. | "Intro" | | 0:47 |
| 2. | "I'm Back" | Khalid Keene; Brian Overton | 3:19 |
| 3. | "R U Ready" | Keene; Overton | 4:15 |
| 4. | "Hit the Floor" (featuring DJ Kool) | John Bowman; Keene | 3:36 |
| 5. | "Let's Get It On" | Keene; Overton | 2:38 |
| 6. | "Remember Me" | Jerome Jefferson; Keene; Overton; Ted Howard | 4:01 |
| 7. | "Tear It Up" | Keene | 3:20 |
| 8. | "Macho Thang" (featuring Aja) | Keene; Overton | 2:59 |
| 9. | "Be a Man" | Keene; Overton; "Macho Man" Randy Savage | 3:00 |
| 10. | "Get Back" | Keene; Overton | 3:25 |
| 11. | "Feel the Madness" | Guy Walker; Keene; Howard; Jefferson | 3:20 |
| 12. | "What's That All About" | Jefferson; Keene; Howard | 3:43 |
| 13. | "Gonna Be Trouble" | Osinachi Nwaneri; Keene | 3:36 |
| 14. | "Perfect Friend" (featuring Prymary Colorz) | Keene; Jefferson; Lanny Poffo | 3:54 |
| Total length: | | | 45:53 |
