= 20 Minute Workout (album) =

Studio album by DJ Kool
- Released: April 18, 1994
- Recorded: 1993–1994
- Genre: Hip hop; go-go
- Length: 40:46
- Label: CLR
- Producer: DJ Kool

DJ Kool chronology
The Music Ain't Loud Enuff (1990)	20 Minute Workout (1994)	Let Me Clear My Throat (1996)

Professional ratings
Review scores
Source	Rating
AllMusic	3/5 stars

20 Minute Workout is the second studio album by DJ Kool, released on April 18, 1994. The title track "20-Minute Workout" was recorded live at Ivory's Nightclub in Richmond, Virginia, on November 20, 1993.

== Track listing ==
1. "20 Minute Workout" (Live) – 7:47
2. "Bass n the Truck" – 5:03
3. "4 the Brothas n the Ghetto" – 5:24
4. "Funky Like a Monkey" – 5:00
5. "Short Work Out" – 6:04
6. "Blood of Willis" – 4:48
7. "Ultra Beat, Monkey" – 3:13
8. "Ultra Beat, Ghettosize" – 0:26
9. "Groovy Bass n Half" – 3:01

== Charts ==
Chart (1994)	Peak position
Billboard Top R&B/Hip-Hop	84
