= Pa' Ti + Lonely =

2020 singles by Jennifer Lopez and Maluma

"Pa' Ti"

Single by Jennifer Lopez and Maluma

from the album Marry Me
- Language: Spanish
- English title: "For You"
- B-side: "Lonely"
- Released: September 24, 2020
- Recorded: 2020
- Studio: Art House (Miami, Florida)
- Genre: Reggaeton
- Length: 3:50
- Label: Universal Studios; Sony Latin
- Songwriters: Andrea Mangiamarch; Edgar Barrera; Jon Leone; Jennifer Lopez; Juan Luis Londoño Arias; Nathanial Campany; Janée Bennett
- Producers: JonTheProducer; Barrera

Jennifer Lopez singles chronology
"Baila Conmigo" (2019)	"Pa' Ti" / "Lonely" (2020)	"In the Morning" (2020)

Maluma singles chronology
"Hawái" (2020)	"Pa' Ti" / "Lonely" (2020)	"Hawái" (remix) (2020)

Music video
- "Pa' Ti" on YouTube

"Lonely"

Single by Maluma and Jennifer Lopez
- Language: Spanish; English
- A-side: "Pa' Ti"
- Released: September 24, 2020
- Recorded: 2020
- Genre: Trap
- Length: 3:19
- Label: Sony Music Latin
- Songwriters: Arias; Lopez; Kevin Mauricio Jiménez Londoño; Bryan Snaider Lezcano Chaverra
- Producers: Kevin ADG; The Rude Boyz

Maluma singles chronology
"Hawái" (2020)	"Lonely" / "Pa' Ti" (2020)	"Hawái" (remix) (2020)

Jennifer Lopez singles chronology
"Baila Conmigo" (2020)	"Pa' Ti" / "Lonely" (2020)	"In the Morning" (2020)

Music video
- "Lonely" on YouTube

"Pa' Ti" and "Lonely" (collectively referred to as "Pa' Ti + Lonely") are two songs recorded by American singer Jennifer Lopez and Colombian singer Maluma for the soundtrack of the 2022 film Marry Me. They were released on September 24, 2020, by Sony Music Latin. The collaboration between Lopez and Maluma came about during the COVID-19 lockdowns. "Pa' Ti" was written by the duo alongside Andrea Mangiamarchi "Elena Rose", Jon Leone and Edgar Barrera and produced by the former two. "Lonely" was written by the duo alongside Kevin Mauricio Jiménez Londoño and Bryan Snaider Lezcano Chaverra "Chan El Genio", who also produced the song under stage names Kevin ADG and Chan El Genio "The Rude Boyz". "Pa' Ti" is a mid-tempo reggaeton song, while "Lonely" features a slower trap beat.

Both songs received positive reviews from music journalists, some of whom highlighted the chemistry between Lopez and Maluma. Commercially, "Pa' Ti" became Lopez's highest chart entry in the United States for a Spanish song since 2014, reaching No. 9 on the Billboard Hot Latin Songs chart. The eight-minute-long, double music video received praise for its cinematic nature, and drew comparisons to the films Chicago and The Wolf of Wall Street.

== Background ==
While promoting her single "Medicine" in April 2019, Lopez told Ebro Darden of Beats 1 radio that the next album she releases will "probably be with a new movie". Later that same month, it was announced that she would be starring alongside Owen Wilson in the romantic comedy, Marry Me (2022). In July 2019, Colombian singer Maluma was cast to play Lopez's fiancé in the film. During their first week of shooting, on October 5, 2019, Lopez and Maluma performed her song "No Me Ames" during his show at Madison Square Garden in New York City. In February 2020, Lopez announced that she would be releasing a new album alongside Marry Me that would also serve as the film's soundtrack. She told Jimmy Fallon that the album would feature "six or eight" songs performed by herself and "two or three" songs performed by Maluma, as well as a duet between the two that is performed as both an uptempo and a ballad.

On June 18, 2020, Lopez revealed that she was working on more new music, teasing: "I cannot wait for you to hear what we've been working on pa' ti". A month later, she posted a photo of herself in the recording studio with Maluma, with the caption: "Pase lo que pase 'toy pa' ti". She later revealed in an interview with Variety that she recorded two new songs with Maluma that would be released "in the near future". According to Lopez, they "had such a fun and natural chemistry" while working on Marry Me, which led them to wanting to record additional music beyond what they had already recorded for the film. Discussing how the collaboration came about, Lopez revealed that she and Maluma spoke via FaceTime during the COVID-19 lockdown: "[Maluma] said, ‘I have a couple of songs. I’m going to send you one.’ And I said, 'I have a song too. I’m going to send you one.'" On September 21, 2020, Lopez and Maluma posted a 15-second teaser on both of their respective social media accounts to announce that they would be releasing a "two-song" collaboration, called "Pa' Ti + Lonely", on September 24, 2020. It was later revealed the two songs would be featured on the Marry Me soundtrack, however "Lonely" did not end up making the final cut.

== Composition ==
"Pa' Ti" is a midtempo reggaeton song in which Lopez and Maluma sing about "what one has to offer the other by way of their wealth and lavish lifestyle." The chorus features the two harmonizing as they state: "Todo lo que tengo es pa’ ti, pa ‘ti / Pase lo que pase, estoy pa’ ti, pa’ ti", which translates to "everything I have is for you, for you / whatever happens, I'm here for you, for you". Meanwhile, "Lonely" features a "slower and steady" trap beat.

== Critical response ==
Jon Caramanica of The New York Times described the collaboration as "A pair of effective new songs from Jennifer Lopez and Maluma, well-matched singers more interested in rhythm than power, more invested in melodrama than depth. 'Pa Ti' is the ascent, a crisp flirtation that’s hard to argue with — both sing with sass and swing. And then 'Lonely' is the collapse, a slightly more morose thumper with less steady vocals." Jessica Roiz of Billboard described the melodies of both tracks as "infectious" and highlighting the "vocal chemistry" between Lopez and Maluma. Also writing for Billboard, Jason Lipshutz stated, "The vocal chemistry is palpable on both tracks, as Lopez eases her approach to match Maluma’s more hushed romance; if the pair combines for a longer collaboration, it would be one to remember." The staff at Billboard later picked "Pa' Ti + Lonely" as one of the "13 Best Female/Male Latin Collaborations of 2020", writing that Lopez and Maluma "broke the internet with their two-part collaboration", "One is an infectious down-tempo reggaeton and the other is a bilingual sensual trap." Jem Aswad of Variety listed "Pa' Ti" as one of the five top songs of the week ending September 25, 2020, but wrote that he preferred the Spanish version of "Pa' Ti" to the Spanglish version as "the sometimes-corny lyrics are less obvious to our gringo ears".

== Commercial performance ==
"Pa' Ti" marked Lopez's highest chart debut in the United States since 2017, debuting at number nine on Billboard's Hot Latin Songs for the chart dated October 10, 2020. It became Lopez's highest entry on the chart since her feature on "Adrenalina" (2014), as well as her seventh top-ten song and Maluma's 13th. "Pa' Ti" also sold 4,000 copies and entered the Latin Digital Songs chart at number one, while "Lonely" debuted at number two.

== Music video ==
The two-part music video for "Pa' Ti" and "Lonely" was directed by Jessy Terrero and shot in Huntington, New York and New York City over the course of three days. Lopez's hair for the video was styled by Chris Appleton, and her makeup was done by Mary Phillips. Describing her look in the video, Appleton said: "The first half of the video she’s kind of on the nicer side, and then in the second video she gets more badass. The first video is kind of clean, and then she’s escaping jail and getting revenge." Lopez collaborated with Rob Zangardi and Mariel Haenn on her wardrobe for the video. The music video features an appearance by Charli D'Amelio, in which she is seen watching the music video on her smartphone.

The eight-minute video begins with a brief interlude, showing scenes of New York, while various media and news outlets can be heard describing "corruption on Wall Street" and mysterious financial crimes being committed. At one point, the voice of Bernie Sanders is heard describing the unknown perpetrator(s). "Pa' Ti" then begins, where a corrupt billionaire, played by Lopez, is under investigation for financial crimes by the FBI. Lopez's character is seen on the balcony of her mansion in the Hamptons, reading newspaper articles about herself and throwing the papers away carelessly. Maluma plays an undercover FBI agent, posing as her bodyguard and driver, tasked with monitoring her both at work and at home. Lopez sings about her lavish lifestyle as Maluma opens the door to her car and transports her to her office, which was filmed on the hundredth floor of The Edge at 30 Hudson Yards. Different scenes showcase Lopez dancing in the office with male dancers, dressed as staff, while Maluma looks on. The two can be seen singing at dusk on the skyscraper's outdoor, glass-floor observation deck, positioned 1,100 feet (335.28 m) above street-level with panoramic views of the city. As the video for "Pa' Ti" progresses, the two gradually become closer and ultimately end up in bed together. "Lonely" begins where "Pa' Ti" ends, showing Lopez and Maluma in bed as the FBI begins raiding her villa. Maluma remains silent as Lopez is arrested, and she soon discovers that her "bodyguard" and lover is, in actuality, an undercover FBI agent who reported her. The two later have a heated encounter as they confront one another in a police interrogation room. Lopez then performs a dance break in prison, before Maluma helps her escape. Two months later, Maluma finds Lopez sitting at a bar in Abu Dhabi; Lopez walks away as "Lonely" ends.

=== Reception ===
The video, as well as a behind-the-scenes video, premiered on September 24, 2020, on TikTok Live. It was the first music video to premiere on the platform. Writing for Harper's Bazaar, Chelsey Sanchez described the video for "Pa' Ti + Lonely" as a "cinematic narrative (think The Wolf of Wall Street meets Chicago)", and also regarded it as having "some of the hottest fashion moments to grace our laptop screens this year." Likewise, iHeartRadio's Regina Star described the videos as a "cinematic 9-minute experience" and "two smoking-hot visuals". Mike Wass of the website Idolator stated that the video "seems to have a bigger budget than most independent movies", calling it a "serve from beginning to end". Chris Murphy of Vulture noted the chemistry between Lopez and Maluma, and wrote that "the music video for 'Lonely' shows us what a Chicago revival starring Jennifer Lopez as Velma Kelly would look like, and it absolutely does not disappoint." Gabriela Arevalo of Radio.com stated that "audiences are taken on an emotional rollercoaster" throughout the two-part video, calling it "a story full of intrigue, suspense, and further proof that Lopez’s dancing skills in Hustlers were just a taste of what the former fly girl can do."

== Live performances ==
Lopez and Maluma performed both the songs live for the first time during the American Music Awards of 2020, at the Microsoft Theater in Los Angeles on November 22, 2020.

== Promotion ==
Upon the premiere of the video through TikTok, Lopez had invited the application's two biggest stars Charli D'Amelio and Addison Rae to start a promotional dance challenge for "Pa' Ti" on the platform. The viral dance challenge features a dance routine which mirrors Lopez's choreography in the music video for "Pa' Ti", and as of September 29, 2020, posts with the hashtag "#PaTiChallenge" had generated over 1.3 billion views on the platform. As part of the challenge, Lopez and TikTok partnered with the yogurt company Yoplait, where the latter agreed to donate $1 to Feeding America for every "#PaTiChallenge" and "#YoplaitimeDonation" hashtag shared until October 30, 2020.

== Track listing ==
Pa' Ti
No.	Title	Writer(s)	Producer(s)	Length
1.	"Pa' Ti"	Jennifer Lopez; Maluma; Andrea Mangiamarchi; Jon Leone; Edgar Barrera	Leone; Barrera; Steve Mackey^{[a]}; Trevor Muzzy^{[b]}	3:50
2.	"Pa' Ti" (Spanglish version)	Lopez; Maluma; Elena Rose; Leone; Barrera; Nathaniel Company; Janée Bennett	Leone; Barrera; Mackey^{[a]}; Muzzy^{[b]}	3:50
Total length:				7:40

Lonely
No.	Title	Writer(s)	Producer(s)	Length
1.	"Lonely"	Maluma; Lopez; Kevin Mauricio Jiménez Londoño; Bryan Snaider Lezcano Chaverra	Kevin ADG; Chan El Genio "The Rude Boyz"; Mackey^{[a]}; Muzzy^{[b]}	3:19
Total length:				3:19

Pa' Ti + Lonely
No.	Title	Writer(s)	Producer(s)	Length
1.	"Pa' Ti"	Lopez; Maluma; Elena Rose; Leone; Barrera	Leone; Barrera; Mackey^{[a]}; Muzzy^{[b]}	3:50
2.	"Pa' Ti" (Spanglish version)	Lopez; Maluma; Elena Rose; Leone; Barrera; Company; Jin Jin	Leone; Barrera; Mackey^{[a]}; Muzzy^{[b]}	3:50
3.	"Lonely"	Maluma; Lopez; Londoño; Chan El Genio	Kevin ADG; The Rude Boyz; Mackey^{[a]}; Muzzy^{[b]}	3:19
Total length:				10:58

=== Notes ===
- ^{^[a]} signifies a miscellaneous producer
- ^{^[b]} signifies a vocal producer

== Credits and personnel ==
Credits adapted from Tidal.

=== "Pa' Ti" ===
- Jennifer Lopez – songwriter, vocals
- Maluma – songwriter, vocals
- Andrea Mangiamarchi "Elena Rose" – songwriter
- Jon Leone – songwriter, producer
- Edgar Barrera – songwriter, producer
- Amber Rubi Urena – A&R coordinator
- Alejandro Reglero – A&R director
- Mike Bozzi – mastering engineer
- Steve Mackey – miscellaneous production
- Luis Barrera Jr. – mixing engineer
- Micheline Medina – project coordinator
- Johnny Ortego – recording engineer
- Julio Reyes – recording engineer
- Natalia Ramírez – recording engineer
- Nico Ramírez – recording engineer
- Trevor Muzzy – recording engineer, vocal producer
- Nathaniel Company – songwriter (Spanglish version only)
- Janée Bennett "Jin Jin" – songwriter (Spanglish version only)

=== "Lonely" ===
- Jennifer Lopez – songwriter, vocals
- Maluma – songwriter, vocals
- Kevin ADG – songwriter, producer, mixing engineer, recording engineer
- Chan El Genio "The Rude Boyz" – songwriter, producer, mixing engineer, recording engineer
- Amber Rubi Urena – A&R coordinator
- Alejandro Reglero – A&R director
- Mike Bozzi – mastering engineer
- Steve Mackey – miscellaneous production
- Luis Barrera Jr. – mixing engineer
- Micheline Medina – project coordinator
- Trevor Muzzy – vocal producer

== Charts ==
=== "Pa' Ti" ===
Chart (2020)	Peak position
Argentina Hot 100 (Billboard)	68
Belgium (Ultratip Bubbling Under Wallonia)	30
Bolivia (Monitor Latino)	12
Bulgaria (PROPHON)	1
Canada Digital Songs (Billboard)	33
Colombia (National-Report)	14
Costa Rica (Monitor Latino)	16
Chile Pop (Monitor Latino)	14
Croatia (HRT)	28
Dominican Republic Pop (Monitor Latino)	5
Global 200 (Billboard)	106
Global Excl. US (Billboard)	91
Ecuador Pop (Monitor Latino)	13
El Salvador (Monitor Latino)	11
Greece Radio Airplay (IFPI)	13
Guatemala (Monitor Latino)	13
Honduras Pop (Monitor Latino)	4
Hungary (Single Top 40)	5
Mexican Espanol Airplay (Billboard)	12
Mexico Pop (Monitor Latino)	9
North Macedonia (Radiomonitor)	9
Panama (Monitor Latino)	18
Paraguay Pop (Monitor Latino)	7
Peru Pop (Monitor Latino)	5
Portugal (AFP)	148
Puerto Rico (Monitor Latino)	1
Romania (Airplay 100)	5
Spain (PROMUSICAE)	57
Switzerland (Schweizer Hitparade)	74
Uruguay (Monitor Latino)	18
US Bubbling Under Hot 100 (Billboard)	25
US Hot Latin Songs (Billboard)	9
US Latin Airplay (Billboard)	1
Venezuela (Record Report)	37

=== "Lonely" ===
Chart (2020)	Peak position
Hungary (Single Top 40)	19

== Certifications ==
=== "Pa' Ti" ===
Region	Certification	Certified units/sales
Brazil (Pro-Música Brasil)	Gold	20,000^{‡}
Mexico (AMPROFON)	Gold	30,000^{‡}
Poland (ZPAV)	Gold	10,000^{‡}
United States (RIAA)	3× Platinum (Latin)	180,000^{‡}
^{‡} Sales+streaming figures based on certification alone.

== Release history ==
Release dates and formats for "Pa' Ti + Lonely"
Region	Date	Format	Version	Label	Ref.
Various	September 24, 2020	Digital download; streaming	"Pa' Ti + Lonely"	Sony Music Latin	
Italy	October 2, 2020	Contemporary hit radio	"Pa' Ti (Spanglish Version)"	Sony Music Latin	
Russia	October 3, 2020	Contemporary hit radio	"Pa' Ti"	Sony Music Latin	
Various	December 11, 2020	12"	"Pa' Ti + Lonely"	Sony Music Latin	
Various	February 5, 2021	12" picture disc	"Pa' Ti + Lonely"	Sony Music Latin	

== See also ==
- List of Billboard Hot Latin Songs and Latin Airplay number ones of 2020
