= On My Way (Jennifer Lopez song) =

2021 single by Jennifer Lopez

Single by Jennifer Lopez

from the album Marry Me
- Released: November 18, 2021
- Genre: Pop
- Length: 3:12
- Label: Universal Studios; Sony Latin
- Songwriters: Ivy Adara; Leroy Clampitt; Michael Pollack
- Producer: Keith Hetrick

Jennifer Lopez singles chronology
"Cambia el Paso" (2021)	"On My Way" (2021)	"Marry Me" (2022)

Music videos
- "On My Way (Marry Me)" on YouTube; "On My Way (Marry Me)" (TELYKast remix) on YouTube

"On My Way (Marry Me)" is a song by American singer Jennifer Lopez recorded for the soundtrack 2022 film Marry Me. The song was released on November 18, 2021, by Universal Studios and Sony Music Latin.

Three more versions of the songs were released. First is On My Way (Marry Me) [TELYKast Remix] which is also in the soundtrack album and the country version of the song stylized as on my way, a duet with Jimmie Allen which is included in his album Tulip Drive. Another remix of the song was released entitled On My Way (Marry Me) [David Solomon Remix].

It is the winner of the Best Song award at the 2022 MTV Movie & TV Awards. It is also nominated at the 13th Hollywood Music in Media Awards under the Song – Onscreen Performance (Film) category.

== Critical reception ==
George Millington of GSG Media gave the song 4 out of 5 stars, describing it as "Lopez's most gripping song to date", one that "plucks at the heartstrings right away." He complimented Lopez's vocals, writing that "the multitalented singer and actress proves why she is still one of the best singers ever to grace the airwaves." He added: "Jennifer is a vocal behemoth and she rises to the occasion with unforgivable charm. Her tones are lovely, and her unique and sweet singing approach soothes the spirit." According to themusicalhype.com, the song is "a respectable, well-rounded single; Lopez sings beautifully and her tone is well-suited for this record, and she achieves the right feels." They also added that "the chorus features the best songwriting and vocals from Lopez who "serves up some nice nuances and ad-libs, including a little falsetto."

== Videos ==
=== Lyric video ===
An official lyric video, showing scenes from the Marry Me movie directed by Kat Coiro, was released on November 22, 2021.

=== Official video ===
The music video for "On My Way" was directed by Santiago Salviche and released on December 3, 2021.

=== Remix video ===
On February 13, 2022, Lopez released a second video for the song's official remix featuring TELYKast.

=== Valentine's Day Remix video ===
The video was released on February 12, 2022, and included in Jennifer's first OntheJLo Email. Ben Affleck directed and gifted it to Jennifer, showing that he and Jennifer have been on their way to each other.

== Live performances ==
Lopez performed the song live for the first time during her set at the Global Citizen Live concert, which took place in New York City on September 25, 2021. Lopez performed the song again during the American Music Awards of 2021, at the Microsoft Theater in Los Angeles on November 21, 2021. Lopez performed the song on The Voice finale in Los Angeles on December 14, 2021.

In March 2022, she performed "On My Way" and her 2005 single "Get Right" at the 2022 iHeartRadio Music Awards; the beginning of her performance featured Billy Porter and some of the queens from RuPaul's Drag Race.

== Charts ==
Chart performance for "On My Way"
Chart (2021–2022)	Peak position
Canada Digital Song Sales (Billboard)	24
Hungary (Single Top 40)	18
UK Singles Downloads (OCC)	64
US Adult Pop Airplay (Billboard)	26

== Release history ==
Release history for "On My Way"
Region	Date	Format	Version	Label	Ref.
Various	November 18, 2021	Digital download; streaming	Original	Universal Studios; Sony Music Latin	
United States	January 10, 2022	Adult contemporary radio	Original	Arista	
United States	January 14, 2022	Digital download; streaming	TELYKast remix	Sony Music Latin	
United States	June 3, 2022	Digital download; streaming	David Solomon remix	Payback	
United States	June 3, 2022	Digital download	David Solomon remix; extended	Payback; Big Beat	
