= DJ Kool =

American rapper (born 1958)

- Born: John W. Bowman Jr. March 20, 1958 (age 68); Washington, D.C., U.S.
- Genres: Hip-hop; go-go
- Occupations: Rapper; DJ; record producer
- Years active: 1979–present
- Labels: CLR; American Recordings; Warner Bros.

John W. Bowman Jr. (born March 20, 1958), better known by his stage name DJ Kool, is an American rapper who produced several popular rap singles in the late 1980s. As a performer, he is best known for his 1996 hit single "Let Me Clear My Throat", the title track from his 1996 album of the same name.

== Career ==
Raised in Washington, D.C., his influence from years of working the go-go and rap circuits became apparent in his music.

In 1996, he released the single "Let Me Clear My Throat" on American Recordings, which charted around the world including the top 40 on the Billboard Hot 100 and top 10 in the UK and Netherlands in March 1997. The song prominently features a sample of "The 900 Number" by the 45 King (which itself features a sample from Marva Whitney's "Unwind Yourself", repeated over a breakbeat for six minutes). The song also began by sampling "Hollywood Swinging" by Kool & the Gang. The song is a recognizable dance floor-filler, and the track remains popular to this day.

In 2001 he featured on Let's Get Dirty (I Can't Get in da Club) by Redman. In 2003, DJ Kool contributed to the song "Hit the Floor" from the "Macho Man" Randy Savage studio album, Be a Man.

== Discography ==
=== Albums ===
List of albums, with selected chart positions
Title	Album details	Peak chart positions		
Title	Album details	US	US Heat.	US R&B
The Music Ain't Loud Enuff	Released: 1990; Label: SOH, Creative Funk; Formats: CD, LP, cassette	—	—	60
20 Minute Workout	Released: 1994; Label: CLR; Formats: CD, LP, cassette	—	—	84
Let Me Clear My Throat	Released: April 23, 1996; Label: CLR, American; Formats: CD, LP, cassette, digital download	161	8	21
Gimmie Dat Beat	Released: April 8, 1997; Label: Liaison; Formats: CD, LP, cassette	—	—	—
"—" denotes a recording that did not chart.

=== Singles ===
- "Let Me Clear My Throat" (1996)
