= Énola Bédard =

Canadian dancer (born 2000)

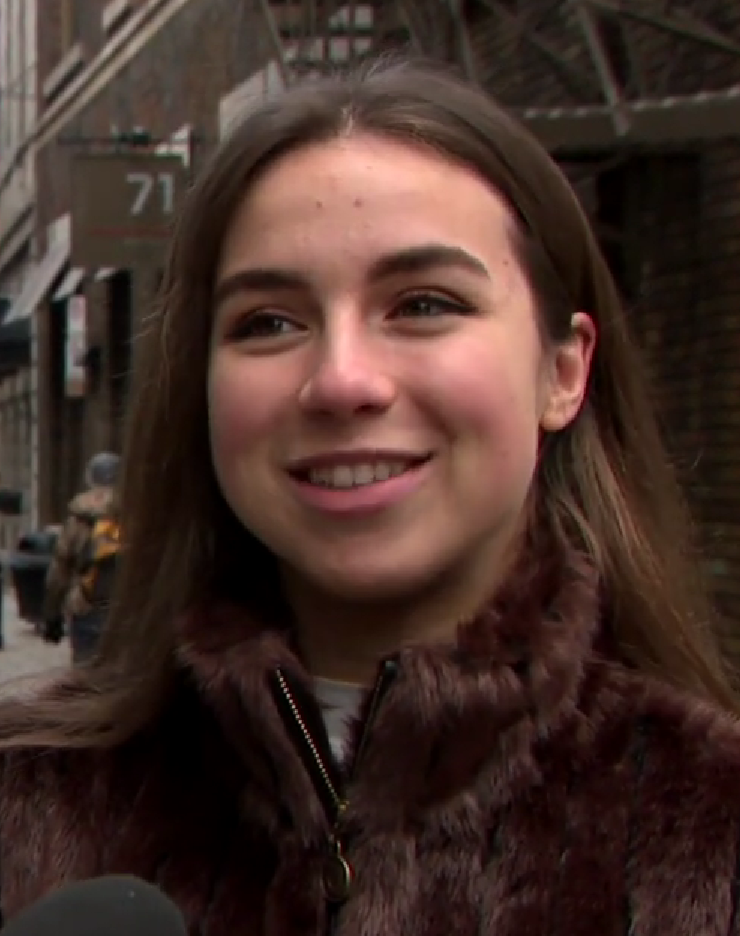
- Bedard in 2024
- Born: Énola Bédard; September 14, 2000 (age 26); Quebec City, Quebec
- Years active: 2017–present

Instagram information
- Page: Enola Bedard
- Followers: 3 million

TikTok information
- Page: enolabedard
- Followers: 17.1 million

YouTube information
- Channel: Enola Bedard
- Genre: Dance
- Subscribers: 5.19 million
- Views: 2.82 billion
- Last updated: August 21, 2026
- Website: www.enolabedard.com

Énola Bédard (born September 14, 2000) is a Canadian dancer, singer, and social media personality. Born in Quebec City, she began gaining popularity on the dance competition show Révolution. She also went viral on TikTok in 2020 and then moved to Los Angeles the following year. In 2026, she performed alongside Shakira at the 2026 FIFA World Cup final halftime show.

== Early life ==
Énola Bédard was born on September 14, 2000, in Quebec City, Quebec. As a child, she did soccer, baseball, skating, swimming, and singing. She wanted to become an actress from the age of eight; she later took ten years of acting classes at the acting school Mode é Arto. When she was eleven, her mother lost $100,000 from a fraud that wanted to start a fake company. They lost their house and Bédard began working at thirteen to help her mother financially and to pay for her dance lessons. Bédard sold chocolate for her mother and mowed lawns for her father. At that age, she had also begun dancing at the school Danse Attitudes, performing in competition teams for hip-hop dancing. She learned ballet, contemporary, jazz, and acro dancing at fifteen. When Bédard was sixteen, she won a $5,500 scholarship and a trip to Los Angeles from the dance company Be Discovered after she choreographed her own contemporary solo. She dropped out of college to focus more on dancing, constantly moving back and forth from Los Angeles, where she participated in two dance programs, immaBEAST and KreativMndz Dance Academy, and Quebec.

== Career ==
Énola Bédard originally gained popularity through appearing on the first and second seasons of the Canadian dance competition show Révolution as a contemporary soloist. During the COVID-19 pandemic, Bédard was unable to have as many opportunities as she previously had. She created a TikTok account in May 2020 and created videos just for fun starting in July. She first went viral in August of that year with a video of her dancing at the Galeries de la Capitale that reached thirty million views in two days. Her mother was her videographer.

In 2021, Bédard was the dancer for the song "Level Up" by Ciara in Just Dance 2022. She moved to Los Angeles in June, holding an O-1 visa. When she first moved, she lived in a content house for a few months. In January 2022, Bédard performed on stage for the first time at the Calibash music festival at the Crypto.com Arena; she was a dancer for rapper Daddy Yankee. In December, she choreographed Shania Twain's performance at the 48th People's Choice Awards.

Starting in 2024, Bédard began to release several pop singles including "Yes, Please!", "Ça brûle", and "Water". She plans to tour with her own songs in the future after releasing an album. In June 2026, Bedard sung as the opening act for the French singer Lorie. The next month, she performed alongside Shakira at the 2026 FIFA World Cup final halftime show. Bédard was chosen to perform after winning an online competition in which she recreated the song "Dai Dai" on the Santa Monica Pier.

== Filmography ==
=== Film ===
Year	Title	Role	Notes
2024	Mean Girls	Social Media Friend	

=== Television ===
Year	Title	Role	Notes
2020	Julie and the Phantoms	Dancer	3 episodes

== Awards and nominations ==
Year	Award	Category	Result	Ref.
2022	Streamy Awards	Dance	Won	
2023	Streamy Awards	Dance	Won	
