= Marry Me (2022 film) =

American film by Kat Coiro

- Theatrical release poster
- Directed by: Kat Coiro
- Screenplay by: John Rogers; Tami Sagher; Harper Dill
- Based on: Marry Me by Bobby Crosby
- Produced by: Elaine Goldsmith-Thomas; Jennifer Lopez; Benny Medina; John Rogers
- Starring: Jennifer Lopez; Owen Wilson; Maluma; John Bradley; Chloe Coleman; Sarah Silverman
- Cinematography: Florian Ballhaus
- Edited by: Michael Berenbaum; Peter Teschner
- Music by: John Debney
- Production companies: Nuyorican Productions; Perfect World Pictures; Kung Fu Monkey Productions
- Distributed by: Universal Pictures
- Release dates: February 9, 2022 (Los Angeles); February 11, 2022 (United States)
- Running time: 112 minutes
- Country: United States
- Language: English
- Budget: $23 million
- Box office: $56.5 million

Marry Me is a 2022 American romantic comedy drama film starring Jennifer Lopez, Owen Wilson, and Maluma. Superstar Kat Valdez (Lopez) decides to marry Charlie Gilbert (Wilson), a math teacher holding a "Marry Me" sign, after learning that her on-stage bridegroom, Bastian (Maluma), has been having an affair. It is directed by Kat Coiro based on a screenplay by John Rogers, Tami Sagher, and Harper Dill. It is based on the 2012 webcomic of the same title by Bobby Crosby.

The film was announced in April 2019, with Lopez and Wilson set to star and Coiro joining the project as director. Universal Pictures acquired the film distribution rights in July 2019. Principal photography took place in Manhattan in October and November 2019. A soundtrack album of the same name by Lopez and Maluma was also produced. The lead single, titled "Pa' Ti", was released on September 24, 2020, and debuted at number nine on Billboard's Hot Latin Songs, marking Lopez's highest chart debut in the United States since 2017.

Marry Me premiered in Los Angeles on February 9, 2022, and was released in the United States theatrically and simultaneously available on Peacock Premium on February 11. It was delayed twice from an original February 2021 release date due to the COVID-19 pandemic. The film received positive reviews from critics, grossing $56.5 million against a budget of $23 million. On streaming, Marry Me became the most-streamed day-and-date title on Peacock.

== Plot ==
Superstar Kat Valdez is a well-known figure in the Latin community who has had four failed high-profile marriages. After "Marry Me", a song by Kat and her fiancé, Bastian, becomes a chart-topper across the world, they plan to hold their wedding ceremony in front of a streaming audience at one of Kat's concerts. Meanwhile Charlie Gilbert, a divorced math teacher, has been having real problems connecting with his 12-year old daughter Lou, and his friend Parker, who has 3 tickets, guilts him into attending the concert with her and bringing Lou.

Just as Kat prepares to go to the altar, a showbiz gossip website publishes a video of Bastian's infidelity with her assistant Tyra. Kat's manager shows her his phone, revealing the fast-spreading news to her. Without any distress, Kat sees Charlie in the crowd holding Parker's sign reading "Marry Me"; to the surprise of the entire venue, she impulsively decides to do so.

Unsure, Charlie goes onstage and marries Kat in front of the world. After the ceremony, she refuses to speak with Tyra and gets into a fight with Bastian as she and Charlie leave. The two are awkward and polite to each other before Kat goes home with a broken heart.

The following day, needing to respond to the frenzied media coverage and speculation about her mental state, Kat decides to stay married to Charlie for a few months to put a positive spin on the situation. He reluctantly agrees, not wanting to cause a stir in either of their personal lives. Charlie poses for media appearances, though he is uncomfortable and hesitant with the scrutiny.

They eventually begin to grow close after spending time together away from the media and her management. Kat learns more about Charlie’s life, especially Lou’s stage fright. Charlie eventually asks Kat to a school dance as a date, and she accepts; that night they kiss and sleep together for the first time, spending the next few weeks together in a real romantic relationship. Kat also encourages Charlie's students and Lou while Charlie prepares his math team for a mathalon. Kat works especially with Lou, who has stage fright, teaching her to dance to take her mind off her anxiety.

Bastian shows up to announce that "Marry Me" has been nominated for a Grammy, Kat's first nomination. Charlie is wary of the fact that Kat and Bastian will have to perform together again, but she insists it is over between them. However, Charlie becomes unsure that he can compare to Bastian and fit into Kat's world; reasoning that their marriage was never real to begin with, he breaks up with her.

Kat writes a love song, "On My Way", that becomes more successful than "Marry Me". While filming an appearance on The Tonight Show with Bastian, Kat realizes it is the night before the mathalon, where she promised to support Lou and Charlie. She corrects rumors, stating that she and Bastian are not back together and she did not write "On My Way" for Bastian but for Charlie; she then abruptly departs the show.

Kat rushes to reunite with Charlie, who is helping Lou overcome her anxiety with the dance Kat taught her. Kat holds up a sign asking Charlie to marry her again, to which Charlie agrees. Charlie and Kat become a happy family with their dog, and Charlie’s strained relationship with Lou improves. In the credits, a series of couples and their stories of how they met are shown.

== Cast ==
- Jennifer Lopez as Katalina "Kat" Valdez
- Owen Wilson as Charlie Gilbert
- Maluma as Bastian
- John Bradley as Colin
- Chloe Coleman as Lou Gilbert
- Sarah Silverman as Parker
- Utkarsh Ambudkar as Coach Manny
- Michelle Buteau as Melissa
- Jameela Jamil as Anikah

In addition, Today host Hoda Kotb and The Tonight Show host Jimmy Fallon make cameo appearances, as hosts of their shows.

== Production ==
In April 2019, it was announced that Jennifer Lopez and Owen Wilson would star in the romantic comedy film Marry Me. Kat Coiro would direct, from a screenplay by John Rogers, Tami Sagher, and Harper Dill, based upon the webcomic of the same name by Bobby Crosby, and STX Entertainment would distribute. In July 2019, it was announced Universal Pictures would distribute the film instead of STX. That same month, Sarah Silverman, John Bradley, and Maluma joined the cast of the film. Michelle Buteau, Jameela Jamil, and Chloe Coleman were cast in October. Principal photography began in and around New York City in October 2019, and concluded on November 22.

== Release ==
Marry Me had its world premiere in Los Angeles on February 9, 2022. It was released in theaters on February 11, 2022, by Universal Pictures. It was previously set for February 12, 2021, but was delayed to May 14, 2021, due to the COVID-19 pandemic, until it was moved to February 11, 2022, because of another shift in the release schedule. It was available for streaming on Peacock the same day. Universal spent $15 million in television commercials promoting the film by the time it premiered in theaters. According to social media analytic RelishMix, the film had a large social media reach of 546.5 million interactions, a number larger than other musicals like 2021's West Side Story at 211.8 million interactions, 2017's The Greatest Showman at 313.2 million, and 2018's Bohemian Rhapsody at 242.1 million.

=== Home media ===
Marry Me was released on digital platforms and on Amazon Prime Video on March 13, 2022, and on Blu-ray and DVD on March 29, 2022, by Universal Pictures Home Entertainment.

== Reception ==
=== Box office ===
Marry Me grossed $22.5 million in the United States and Canada, and $28.0 million in other territories, for a worldwide total of $50.5 million, against a budget of $23 million. Audiences polled by CinemaScore gave the film an average grade of "B+" on an A+ to F scale, while those at PostTrak gave it an 80% positive score, with 66% saying they would definitely recommend it.

In the United States and Canada, Marry Me was released alongside Death on the Nile and Blacklight, and was projected to gross $6–11 million from 3,642 theaters in its opening weekend. The film went on to debut to $7.9 million, finishing third behind Death on the Nile and holdover Jackass Forever. On Valentine's Day, the movie earned first place at the box office with $3 million, making it the first romantic comedy to lead the Valentine's Day box office since 2014's About Last Night. The film finished third in its second weekend, with $3.7 million, sixth in its third weekend, with $1.9 million, then was cut back to 1,211 theatres for its fourth weekend, dropping out of the domestic box office top ten when it earned $0.6 million.

Outside the U.S. and Canada, the film grossed $16.5 million in its opening weekend from 65 international markets. The film earned $5.2 million in its second weekend, $2.7 million in its third, and $1.1 million in its fourth from 67 markets.

=== Audience viewership ===
Marry Me became the most-streamed day-and-date film on Peacock, according to Comcast CEO and chairman Brian L. Roberts. In April 2022, Deadline Hollywood reported that over six million Peacock accounts had streamed the film. In June 2022, it also became a hit on Amazon Prime, staying at number one for about 2 weeks.

=== Critical response ===
Metacritic review
breakdown (unweighted)

Positive
18 (39%)
Mixed
23 (50%)
Negative
5 (11%)

On the review aggregator website Rotten Tomatoes, 61% of 216 critics' reviews are positive, with an average rating of 5.6/10. The website's consensus reads: "Marry Me's silly storyline is heavy on the 'something old' and 'something borrowed,' but the movie's well-matched leads make it easy to say 'I do.'" Metacritic, which uses a weighted average, assigned the film a score of 51 out of 100, based on 46 critics, indicating "mixed or average" reviews.

Angie Han of The Hollywood Reporter wrote: "Those hoping the film might push the genre to its most extravagant limits may be surprised at how (relatively) low-key their love story ends up being. But sometimes that's the most pleasurable kind of fairy tale — one so close to convincing, you can forget for a spell that it's all just a dream." Owen Gleiberman of Variety wrote that "[the] bar for rom-coms is not high, and this one, ludicrous as it often is, inches over the bar. But I would no more call it a good movie than I'd pretend fast food is high in nutrients."

=== Accolades ===
Award	Date of ceremony	Category	Recipient	Result	Ref.
MTV Movie & TV Awards	June 5, 2022	Best Song	"On My Way (Marry Me)" – Jennifer Lopez	Won	
Hollywood Music in Media Awards	November 16, 2022	Best Song – Onscreen Performance (Film)	Jennifer Lopez for "On My Way (Marry Me)"	Nominated	
Hollywood Music in Media Awards	November 16, 2022	Best Soundtrack Album	Jennifer Lopez and Maluma for Marry Me	Nominated	
Hollywood Music in Media Awards	November 16, 2022	Live Concert for Visual Media	Marry Me Live Concert Special	Nominated	
People's Choice Awards	December 6, 2022	Comedy Movie of 2022	Marry Me	Nominated	
People's Choice Awards	December 6, 2022	Female Movie Star of 2022	Jennifer Lopez	Nominated	
People's Choice Awards	December 6, 2022	Comedy Movie Star of 2022	Jennifer Lopez	Nominated	
