= Cultural impact of Jennifer Lopez =

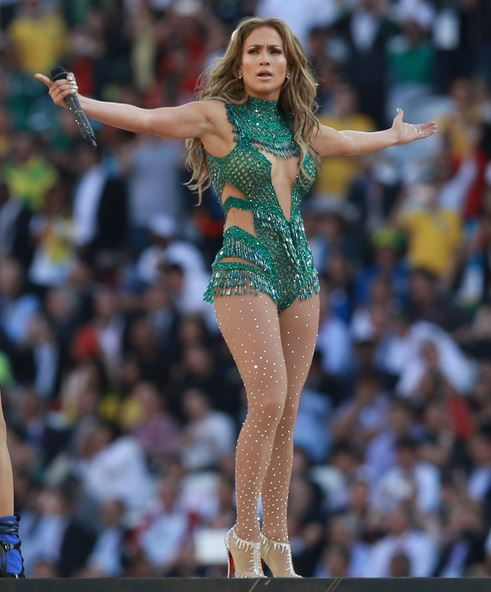
Lopez in 2014

American singer and actress Jennifer Lopez has had a cultural impact through her films, music, television work, dance, fashion, lifestyle and entrepreneurship. For her contributions to the arts, Lopez is regarded as one of the most influential entertainers in the world. A number of sources have described her as the most influential Latin entertainer of all time, credited with breaking racial barriers in the entertainment industry.

A significant cultural figure, Lopez is considered the "first Latina superstar" by writer Ned Zeman, and has been described as embodying the American Dream. With her early films, she was credited with breaking barriers for Hispanic and Latino Americans in Hollywood, having received the highest salaries ever for a Latin actress and subverting genre conventions by playing non-stereotypical roles. One of the few actors to successfully transition into the music industry, she became one of the biggest pop stars at the turn of the century. She helped lead the Latin pop movement in English music, having increased the influence and visibility of Latin culture in mainstream music. Lopez has been dubbed the "Queen of Dance" by media outlets. She also impacted competition-based reality television with her career resurgence as a judge on American Idol.

A fashion icon, Lopez has shaped various fashion and beauty trends through her red carpet fashion and personal style, including her Versace dress, which inspired the creation of Google Images. She helped redefine celebrity branding and made the celebrity fragrance market a lucrative industry. Her status as a Latina icon has produced considerable academic analysis of her influence on shifting cultural norms, especially through the public discourse on her body. Commentators have also noted her ability to benefit from racial ambiguity, reflected by the contrast between her music and Hollywood image. Lopez has been further discussed for challenging standards around age and sexuality, while her highly publicized personal life had a considerable effect on tabloid journalism. Through her performances and lobbying, Lopez has advocated for causes including education, television diversity, and immigration.

== Influence and fame ==
Lopez was named one of Time's 100 most influential people in the world in 2018. Previously, Time listed her as one of the most influential Hispanics in America, remarking: "...over a decade ago, she was an anonymous background dancer on the second-rated sketch-comedy show. Today she's known by two syllables." In 2012, Forbes ranked her as the world's most powerful celebrity and the 38th most powerful woman. Lopez is considered a pop icon, with VH1 ranking her at number 15 on their list of 200 Greatest Pop Culture Icons in 2003.

Lopez has been ranked among the top ten most admired women in the world, according to surveys conducted by YouGov and Gallup. Described as "the biggest female star in the world" at the peak of her career, Lopez has been noted for her ability to start trends, which has prompted the usage of the phrase "the J.Lo effect" in popular culture. The phrase has been used in numerous different contexts, including in relation to Lopez's impact on reality competition programming, celebrity overexposure, a phenomenon resembling mate choice copying, and a "fashion craze that promoted curvaceousness and redefined mainstream ideals of feminine beauty". Journalist Michael Joseph Gross posits that Lopez's stardom, unlike other celebrities, is more about her life story than her work. Gerrick Kennedy of the Los Angeles Times describes Lopez as having "unbridled omnipresence in pop culture", while being a "consummate performer who is more famous than any one of their works".

== Entertainment industry ==
=== Film ===
Lopez's film career has been credited with paving the way for greater representation of Latino Americans in Hollywood. Biographer Kathleen Tracy opined that "Lopez blazed a trail no openly Latin actress had gone before", noting that previous Latina stars like Raquel Welch had cosmetically downplayed their ethnicity and changed their names. Cindy Pearlman of The Record said Lopez brought a "Latina presence to a film industry which for most of its history has been a whites-only preserve."

Lopez is the highest-paid Latina actress in history, making up to US$15 million per film during the 2000s. With her role in Selena (1997), she became the first Latin actress in history to earn $1 million for a film role. Writer Camila Barbeito said Lopez was "a pioneer in helping Latina stars get paid their true worth, and changed the game forevermore." In her early films such as Blood and Wine (1996), Lopez played stereotypical roles which signified her as a "racialized, exoticized" other, and was typecast as the "maid" and "dishwasher". This shifted with Selena, which "affirmed her Latinx identity, and won her the loyalty of that significant section of the US and global audience." She was the first Hispanic actress to lead a "major Hollywood film" since Rita Hayworth. Her next film Anaconda, which co-starred Ice Cube, was the highest-grossing film of 1997 which starred a Latino. Critic Joe Leydon said Anaconda subverted genre conventions by being "the first movie of its kind to have a Latina and an African-American" as its stars.

With Out of Sight (1998), where her character's ethnicity is a mere sidenote, Lopez became an "anomaly in the traditionally white space" of mainstream Hollywood at the time. Scholar Frances Negrón-Muntaner observed that Lopez had "achieved what generations of Hollywood Latino actors continue to dream about: ethnic 'blind' casting", adding that "[If Selena] made her the top Latina actress in Hollywood, Out of Sight secured her place as a top talent, period." By deliberately avoiding stereotypical roles, biographer James Robert Parish said Lopez "helped minimize racial boundaries in show business." Other Latin actresses such as Jessica Alba were said to be "following in the path set by Lopez" by securing "non-ethnic-specified roles", which contrasted with their earlier work.

Lopez's role in her first romantic comedy, The Wedding Planner (2001), was a "major departure" from stereotypical parts for Latina actresses. Wanting to break away from her earlier typecasting, Lopez and her agents had to convince director Adam Shankman and studio executives to cast her. Lopez said: "...the idea of a Latina girl starring in a romantic comedy was like, what? ... Why can’t I be the girl in the movie? Just the girl." She would later become known for starring in romantic comedies, and has been described as the "Queen of Romantic Comedies". Lopez's perceived Academy Award snub for Hustlers (2019), which led to "renewed focus" on the academy's diversity issues, was referenced by Los Angeles mayor Eric Garcetti when announcing a new initiative to increase Latino representation in Hollywood.

=== Music ===
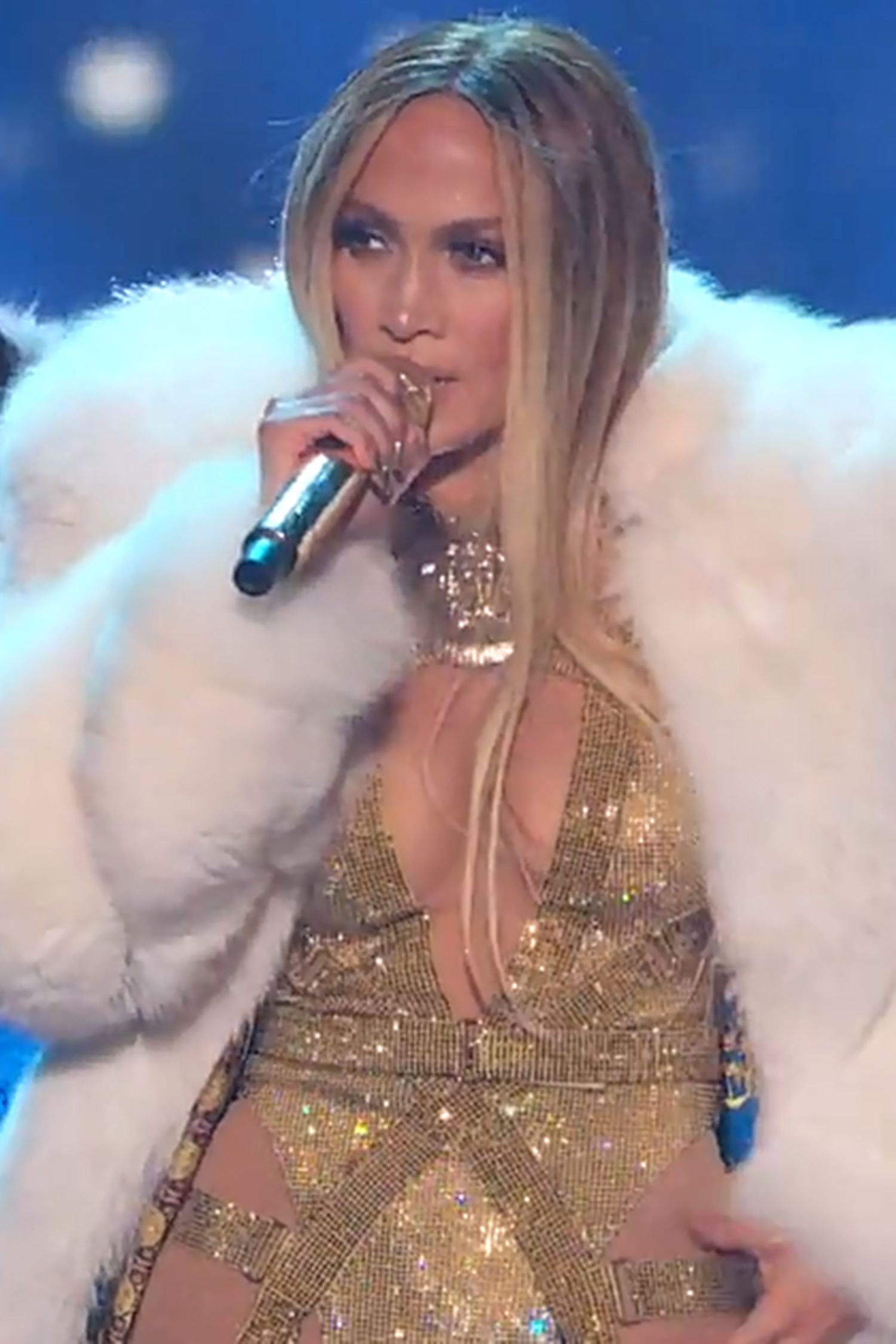
Lopez performing at the 2018 MTV Video Music Awards

With her musical debut, Lopez helped drive the "Latin explosion" occurring in entertainment during the late 1990s. Historian Roger Bruns considered her "an influential force in driving a growing Latin cultural influence in popular music" at the time, and The Recording Academy credited her with helping propel the Latin pop movement in American music. Considered "one of the most important Latina pop stars", Rolling Stone said she paved "the way for other American-born Latina pop stars" including Selena Gomez and Becky G. Scholar Aida Hurtado observed that Lopez's "transnational focus" also influenced Latin American pop artists to enter the U.S. market by recording English music, including Shakira, Thalía and Paulina Rubio. Along with Ricky Martin, Lopez helped increase the visibility of Latin music in international markets including East Asia and Canada. In 2002, the Chicago Tribune opined that Lopez had "emerged as the next-generation Madonna" due to her "multitasking career". In 2024, the New Statesman wrote: "She was the first woman to demonstrate that a Madonna could be a Latina, and Latina voices are one of the dominant forces in global pop now."

Lopez's music has been credited with helping influence the trajectory of 2000s music. With songs like "Waiting for Tonight" and "Let's Get Loud", the St. Louis Post-Dispatch regarded her as the lead artist in the dance-pop genre at the time. Her music has also been noted for its impact on Latin dance music, electronic dance music, and R&B. Lopez's collaboration with rapper Ja Rule, "I'm Real (Murder Remix)", had an influence on future pop rap collaborations, having "helped cement the lasting power of the pop/hip-hop composite." "I'm Real" reached number one in the United States based on airplay of both the remix and original, which are essentially different songs sharing the same title. This led to a change of Billboard policy, whereby identically named songs with substantially different melodies are not combined when computing chart positions. In 2022, U.S. Congressman Joaquin Castro and the Congressional Hispanic Caucus nominated 33 works by Latino musicians to be inducted into the Library of Congress's National Recording Registry, which included Lopez's J.Lo (2001).

Lopez's discography is noted for its diversity and borrowing "liberally" from various genres. Her music often blends English and Spanish; Billboard said she has "never been one to downplay her Latinidad, and always makes sure to display it" in her music, "regardless of genre". A hallmark of Lopez's music has been the theme of "staying grounded", and lyrics about her Bronx upbringing. The title of her debut album On the 6 (1999) references the subway service she took when travelling from the Bronx to Manhattan, while J.Lo, titled after the nickname her fans gave her, was a "reminder that the mainstream success had not affected her connection with her roots." Several artists were noted to follow this trend with their album titles, including Janet Jackson with Damita Jo and Mariah Carey with The Emancipation of Mimi. Themes of social class, immigrant success and remaining humble are apparent in "Jenny from the Block". This prompted a trend of artists releasing songs which juxtaposed their "upbringing to their celebrity status", including Gwen Stefani ("Orange County Girl"), Faith Hill ("Mississippi Girl"—described as a "countrified 'Jenny from the Block'"), and Fergie ("Glamorous").

=== Crossover ===
Often described as a triple threat performer, Lopez was one of few actors to successfully cross over into music. Rolling Stone acknowledged the "extraordinary difficulty for a film star of Lopez’s calibre" to transition into music. Rachel Sklar of The Huffington Post called Lopez a "trailblazer" and noted the influence of her crossover: "Beyoncé, Miley, Gaga, any actress who's ever released an album – they are all standing on the shoulders of J.Lo. She was a true triple threat – actress, singer, dancer … and packaged it sometimes outrageously but always sexily." With her second album J.Lo and film The Wedding Planner, Lopez became the first and only woman to have a number one film and album simultaneously in the United States. She was described as the third female performer, after Barbra Streisand and Whitney Houston, "to achieve such a level of success" in both industries.

=== Television ===
Making her television debut on the sketch comedy series In Living Color in 1991, Lopez's "role as one of the leading 'Fly Girls' helped expose mainstream American audiences to urban dance styles, music, and fashion." In 2011, Lopez began starring as a judge on American Idol, which made her one of the highest-paid American television stars. She became a "major audience draw" for the series, and the ratings success of her casting led to a trend of networks hiring high-profile judges for similar shows such as The X Factor and The Voice, which The Hollywood Reporter branded "the J.Lo effect". She was also credited with beginning the trend of musicians using shows like American Idol to "raise their musical profiles". This paved the way for other high-profile stars to join judging panels on reality television shows, including Christina Aguilera, Britney Spears, Mariah Carey and Katy Perry. Lopez parlayed her return to prominence on American Idol into what Billboard called "the most impressive reality-TV-based rejuvenation of a music career ever." She was deemed the "world's greatest musical comeback act", based on a study which analysed over one billion Google searches since 2004. Lopez had other successful television ventures in the late 2010s, including the series Shades of Blue and World of Dance. Iginio Straffi, creator of Winx Club, cited Lopez as the influence for the character of Flora.

=== Dance ===
Often referred to as the "Queen of Dance", Lopez has received acclaim for her highly choreographed dancing. Her music videos, which made her the first Latin performer to receive the Michael Jackson Video Vanguard Award, are known for including dance breaks; MTV writer Ross McNeilage said: "We struggle to think of one artist who has shown such dedication over two decades to keep dance alive in visuals". In 2015, Michael Cragg of The Guardian stated that with dancing "going out of fashion" in the music industry, "there are very few pop stars who still perform like she does". Brian Schaefer of The New York Times noted that her series World of Dance, unlike other American dance competition programs, foregrounded dancers and allowed them to craft their own performances. Lopez said her goal was to create "a venue for dancers to actually be the stars". Lopez's performance as a stripper in Hustlers, which she shared the training process of online, led to a surge in interest in pole dancing which Fox Business dubbed a "fitness craze"; this resulted in a spike in business for dance studios. Choreographer Johanna Sapakie said: "There's so much more widespread attention about pole dancing in and out of the clubs right now because of the movie and J. Lo."

=== Influence on other performers ===
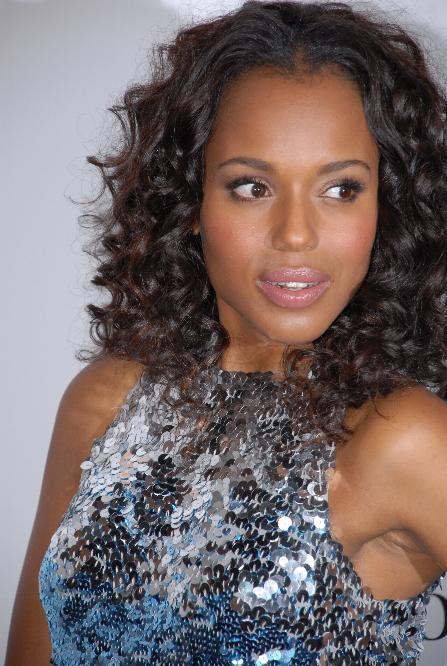
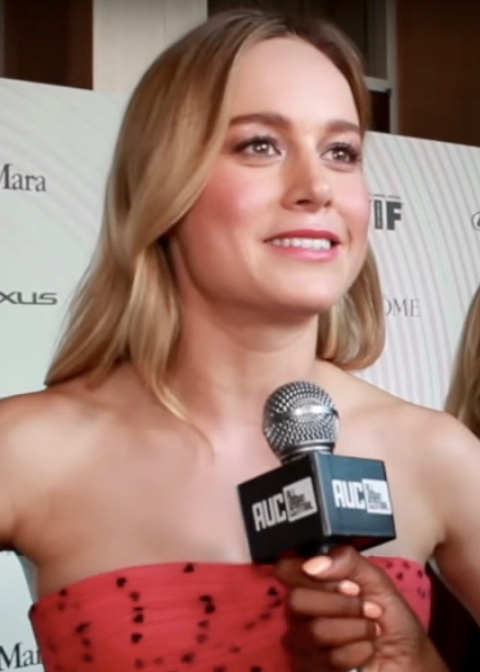
Actresses Kerry Washington (left) and Brie Larson (right) have credited Lopez with inspiring them to enter show business.

Kerry Washington, who grew up in the same neighborhood as Lopez, said she would not have "taken a risk in [her] career" if not for Lopez, calling her "a powerful example—not just for women of color but for anyone who has been made to feel 'other'". Brie Larson stated that seeing Lopez in Selena made her want to be an actor. Her performance in Selena also inspired the careers of Selena Gomez and Q'orianka Kilcher.

Actress Eva Longoria credited Lopez with breaking barriers for Latin actors, stating that she "broke down so many doors so that we could walk through them." America Ferrera said there was "no roadmap" for succeeding in Hollywood as a Latin actress before Lopez. She has also been credited for paving the way for Latinas by Jessica Alba and Kat DeLuna, with the former saying Lopez "opened doors for ethnic girls like me". Gwen Stefani studied Lopez's Vegas residency while developing her own, saying that she "always looked up to her".

Other entertainers who have cited Lopez as an influence or inspiration include Adrienne Bailon, Camila Cabello, Sofia Carson, Mike Doughty, Fifth Harmony, Becky G, Ryan Guzman, Vanessa Hudgens, Jessie James Decker, Kelly Key, Demi Lovato, Maluma, Tate McRae, Camila Mendes, Normani, Rita Ora, Pitbull, Princess Nokia, Keke Palmer, Francia Raisa, Naya Rivera, Bebe Rexha, Rosa Salazar, Britney Spears, and Taylor Swift.

== Culture and racial politics ==
=== Latino culture ===
The world's most famous Latina. The world’s most famous Gen-Xer. A one-woman assault on cultural clichés. A gangster. A hustler. J.Lo's career has been packed with glorious highs and a few hilariously disastrous lows, just because that's how legends roll. There was no Jennifer Lopez before her.

— Rob Sheffield on Lopez's career, Rolling Stone (2022)

Journalists have recognized Lopez's cultural significance to the Latino community, with BBC News and People en Español describing her as the world's most famous Hispanic person. In Race in American Television: Voices and Visions That Shaped a Nation (2021), anthropologist Justin D. García wrote that, with Latinos becoming the nation's largest minority in the late 1990s, "Lopez’s ascent to international fame gave a public face to the dramatic growth and social, cultural, and economic influence of Latinos in the United States." Lopez contributed to increased Latino visibility in the media, which "enhanced group consciousness and identity" among Latinos. Scholars have considered Lopez a symbol of the American Dream during a period of "revoking affirmative action and other propositions against Latinos in the United States". Writer Michelle Herrera Mulligan said "to see someone with a wide nose and a big [rear] — I felt like I was being born. That simply didn’t exist before in popular culture."

Lopez was among a group of Latin entertainers whose cultural impact was attributed to their being part of "Generation Ñ", "young Latinos who were bilingual and bicultural", speaking Spanglish or English rather than Spanish. Lopez's Spanish itself has been criticized; it is described as "classic Nuyorican" and "Bronx-inflected Spanish". Latina magazine founder Christy Haubegger attributed Lopez's influence to her being "the first icon that generationally fits" young Latino Americans who followed celebrity culture. Lopez was featured on the first cover of Latina in 1996, with editor Galina Espinoza writing in 2011 that there is "no recounting of modern Latina history without Jennifer". Journalist Isabel González Whitaker opined that Lopez "opened the door to [Latino culture having a] broader appeal". However, Sandy M. Fernandez of The Washington Post said she is also "a figure who straddles an amazing number of Latino fault lines, areas of often vehement disagreement about what is and isn't Latino."

The publicity surrounding Lopez's body was considered a sign of her social power in "changing cultural standards within the mainstream media as a whole". Academic Jillian Báez suggested that "Lopez and her body functions as a site of struggle as a contestation for debating larger issues concerning the everyday lives of Latinas in the U.S." Described as "arguably the most visible Latina in contemporary mainstream popular culture" by Helene Shugart of the University of Utah, Lopez has been the subject of considerable scholarly analysis in relation to ethnicity, class, "body politics", Latin culture, gender, and race. The Guardian reported that Lopez was among the reasons for British students increasingly electing to learn Spanish for their GCSEs.

In 2019, she was presented with keys to the city of Miami Beach, with July 24 being declared "Jennifer Lopez Day". Lopez's Super Bowl halftime show performance in 2020, which she co-headlined with Shakira, was considered a "culturally historic moment" for the Latin community. Their "mere presence" was described as "a rebuke against weaponizing racism and xenophobia for political gain" in light of the Trump administration family separation policy. In 2023, a wax figure based on Lopez's opening look at the Super Bowl was unveiled by Madame Tussauds New York. Lopez has worked closely with Latina small business owners, and in 2022 partnered with Grameen America to help disburse $14 billion in loan capital and 6 million hours of education to low-income Latina entrepreneurs; Chloe Melas of NBC News called the initiative "unprecedented".

=== Puerto Rico ===
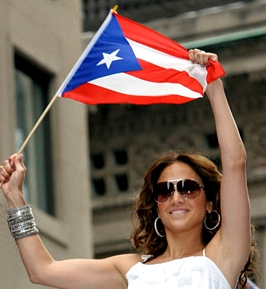
Lopez waving the Puerto Rican flag in 2009 at the Puerto Rican Day Parade in Manhattan

Due to her Puerto Rican heritage, Lopez has become a "symbol" for the U.S. territory. According to scholar Frances Negrón-Muntaner, Lopez was among the entertainers who "made their Puerto Rican identity an important part of their star personas and at times conspired to raise the value attributed to boricuas in American culture. After decades of being ignored or humiliated by government institutions and the mass media, boricuas ... finally seemed to be blessed by God, civilization, and Billboard magazine." Puerto Rico was the setting of Lopez's first concert, which was broadcast by NBC to twelve million viewers. Her clothing line prominently featured the Puerto Rican flag on various items. She has also taken part in the National Puerto Rican Day Parade multiple times. In 2014, scientists named a species of aquatic mite found in Puerto Rico, Litarachna lopezae, after Lopez.

After the island was impacted by Hurricane Maria in 2017, Lopez promoted fundraising initiatives and donated $1 million of her concert proceeds to the island. Vogue said she was "the celebrity who perhaps worked the hardest and fastest toward getting aid to Puerto Rico." She later hosted a telethon which raised $35 million for the island. The Puerto Rican flag was featured prominently in her Super Bowl performance, where Lopez wore a reversible cape featuring the Puerto Rican flag on one side, and the American flag on the other; she was joined by her daughter singing "Born in the U.S.A.". Variety writer Cata Balanzo said the performance shined "a light on the grief and difficult circumstances her island and her people have endured the past few years." Julia Ricardo Varela of The Washington Post said it offered a "glimmer of hope" for Puerto Rico after natural disasters and political strife. The U.S. flag featured on the outside of Lopez's cape "intensified a longstanding political debate on the island" over the Puerto Rico statehood movement.

=== Black culture ===
Hip-hop culture has featured prominently in Lopez's music, fashion, and personal life. Scholar Michelle González posits that "the highs and lows of her relationship with the black community reflect a broader ambiguity within black–Latino/a relations." Lopez became known for her foray into hip hop music and collaborations with rappers; her adoption of the stagename J.Lo was a "culmination of her hip hop persona". The hip hop community was viewed as her "core fan base" in the early 2000s, while her relationship with Sean Combs gave her "elevated status" in the black community. In New York Ricans from the Hip Hop Zone (2003), Raquel Z. Rivera observed that Lopez "loomed large in the hip hop collective conscious as the embodiment of Latina desirability", with articles about her appearing regularly in hip hop magazines such as Vibe, XXL and Ego Trip. In 2017, Las Vegas Weekly credited Lopez's Las Vegas residency for bringing "more hip-hop than the Strip has ever seen". Lopez's husband and filmmaker Ben Affleck said she assisted in the scriptwriting process of his film Air (2023) by helping him understand the impact of Black culture in the US.

Lopez has attracted accusations of cultural appropriation. Her controversial use of the racial slur nigga in her song "I'm Real (Murder Remix)" generated significant debate in 2001. Some protesters accused her of racism, and demanded the song be pulled from radio. Author Earl Ofari Hutchinson felt that protesters "must aim the same fire at black entertainers who make a fetish out of using racially degrading words as they do at Lopez." Scholar Miriam Jiménez Román suggested that Lopez, who "represents an often-suppressed history of hip hop culture that in its inception was as much Jamaican and Puerto Rican as African American", was "able to traverse the difficult racial boundaries" by emphasizing "her connection to Bronx street culture."

In 2020, controversy arose over Lopez using the term negrita in her song "Lonely" with Maluma, the literal translation of which is "black girl". This fuelled debates surrounding "dissections of language and culture" and "literal versus figurative translations". Some pointed out that negrita is a Spanish term of endearment which has extended to non-black people, while others labelled it problematic and offensive.

=== Racial ambiguity ===
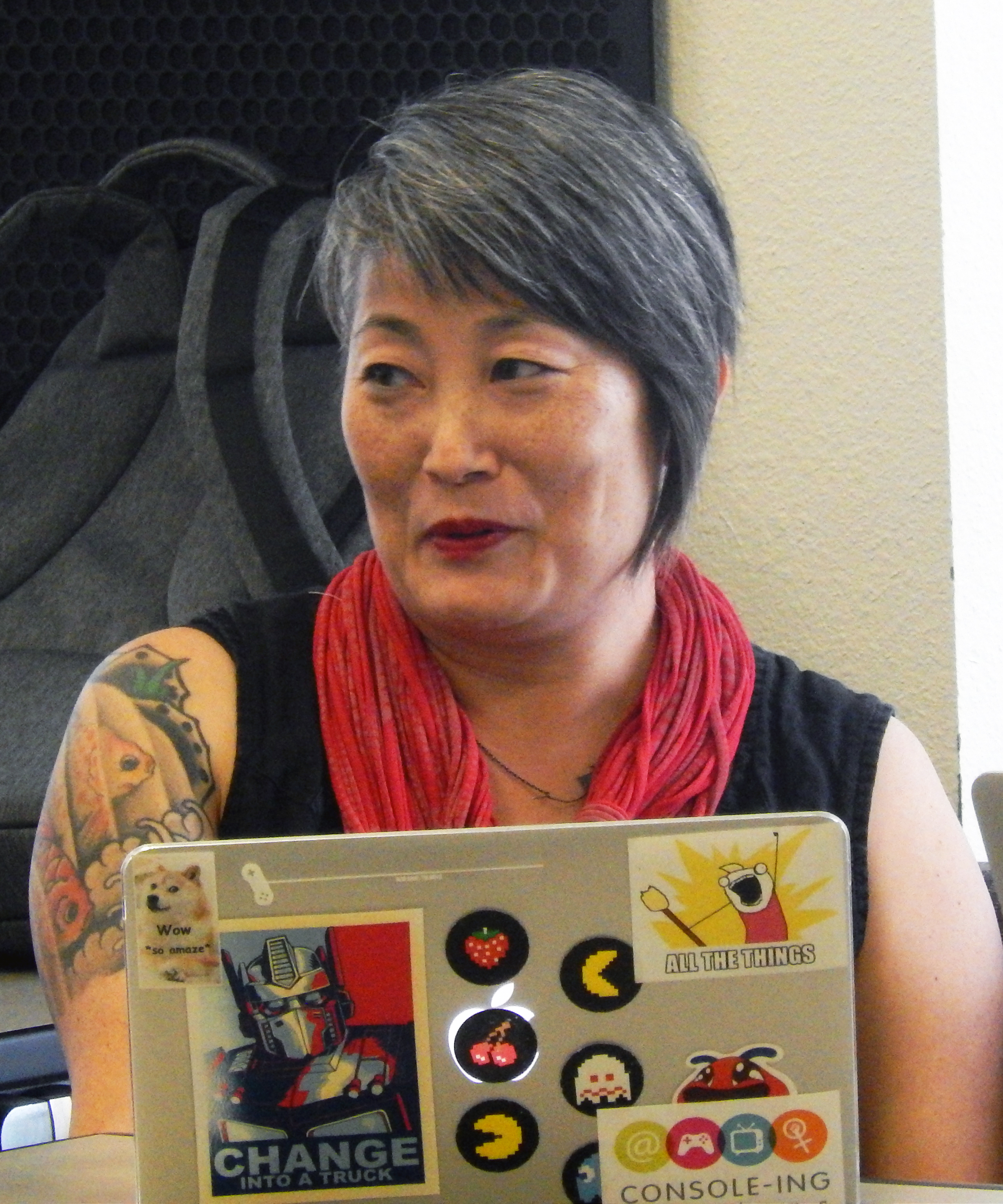
Scholar Lisa Nakamura describes Lopez's construction in the media as a "racial project"

Scholar Todd Boyd describes race as an "important cultural marker" for Lopez's rise to fame, though perceived changes in Lopez's image over the years, including "weight loss and lightening her hair", have been criticized in the context of race. Petra Rivera-Rideau of The Washington Post observed that while Lopez's music "stressed her urban Puerto Rican roots, her film career benefitted from her associations with whiteness" or "racially ambiguous" roles. Scholar Priscilla Peña Ovalle attributes Lopez being "massively marketable" to her "moving toward whiteness in Hollywood and blackness via MTV". In film, Lopez has played a range of ethnicities including Cuban, Mexican, mestiza, and ethnically ambiguous parts. Her portrayal of an Italian woman in The Wedding Planner was criticized as "a case of classic Hollywood whitewashing."

In Digitizing Race: Visual Cultures of the Internet (2008), Lisa Nakamura posited that the "If You Had My Love" music video showcased "J. Lo's readiness to fill different musical, national, and ethnic niches", noting her "shifts from cornrowed hip-hop girl with baggy pants and tight shirts to high-heeled Latina diva to generic pop star with straightened hair and yoga pants". Scholar Mayra Rivera found Lopez's "performative fluidity" problematic, arguing that it is "never some final transgressive liberating crossing of borders", as some Latinas argue. Discussing the "Jenny from the Block" video, which plays into Lopez's "urban identity", Vanity Fair critic Sonia Saraiya observed "how cannily Lopez has played with the categories assigned to her throughout her career, even though at least at the beginning, those categories tended to play with her—Latina bad girl, hip-hop dancer, thoughtful performer, sexy, silly, sweet."

Ovalle posited that Lopez popularized a trend of using racial ambiguity for branding purposes, writing: "In a post-Lopez period, a wave of brown women ― from Shakira to Beyoncé to even Hilary Duff in Middle Eastern brownface ― are using the codes of in-betweenness in hopes of tapping the fashion or cosmetics industries." The promotional campaign for her perfume Still Jennifer Lopez saw Lopez sporting a "platinum blond wig" and mimicking Marilyn Monroe, though the media focused on Lopez's ethnicity, "describing it as a 'Latina take' on the vintage sex symbol".

== Image and appearance ==
=== Body and beauty standards ===
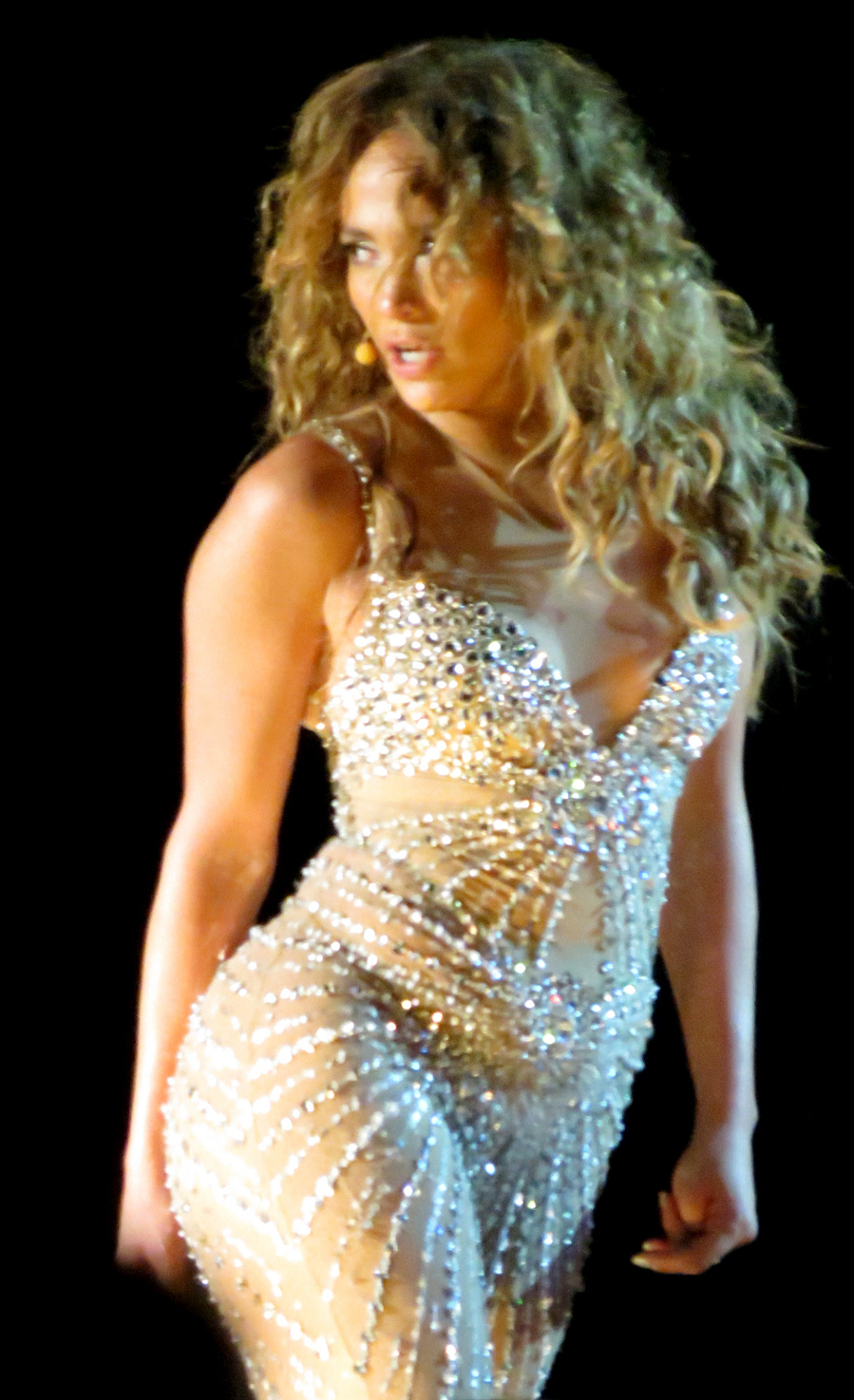
Lopez during her Dance Again World Tour, 2012

Widely discussed for her curvaceous figure and beauty, Lopez has been credited with influencing a shift in mainstream body image and redefining cultural beauty standards. She is often celebrated for her hourglass figure, with Vanity Fair describing her buttocks as "in and of themselves, a cultural icon". Early in her career, Lopez's body was viewed as a problem, and required hiding by Hollywood costume designers. Her body would soon be embraced by mainstream American media, her buttocks becoming "a national obsession". While curvaceous bodies were already the "standard of beauty" in black and Latino communities, Lopez introduced it into the "mainstream (white) public discourse". The subsequent surge in popularity of buttock augmentation surgery in the early 2000s was attributed to Lopez.

In Latin Sensations (2001), Herón Marquez wrote: "Because she wasn't rail thin, Lopez had broken the mold and allowed millions of women to feel good about their bodies. Suddenly, it was okay for women to have hips, curves, and a big backside." Anthropologist Justin D. García opined that "Lopez’s most profound cultural impact may have been her influence in prompting a shift in U.S. ideals of feminine beauty", noting: "Media attention on Lopez’s curvy figure and caramel complexion challenged pre-existing Eurocentric standards of feminine beauty dominant in North American society at the time, which emphasized a fair complexion, a tall stature, and a slender build." In the 1990s, Lopez dressed to accentuate her curves and publicly embraced her body; author Mary Beltrán said this was a potentially "revolutionary act with respect to Anglo beauty ideals". According to Negrón-Muntaner, Lopez embracing her body―a "sign of her lowliness as a racialized Latina"—was a way to upset "'white' notions of beauty and good taste".

Lopez's body has been a major cultural shorthand for ideas about sex, race, class, and gender norms for more than 20 years now. Her body in that famous green Versace gown from the 2000 Grammys red carpet led to the creation of Google Images. Directors go out of their way to center her butt in their movies.

— Constance Grady, Vox (2020)

In 2020, Vox noted the "thriving academic sub-discipline of peer-reviewed articles on the discourse about Jennifer Lopez, her body, and especially her butt." According to scholar Traci C. West, Lopez defying mainstream standards of beauty signalled a possible "breakthrough in the public's imagination of racial norms." However, West said this also created "yet another means for valuing the capacity to be seen by whites as desirable". Journalist Dream Hampton said the objectification of Lopez's body "has everything to do with white America's gaze on ethnic bodies", noting: "The objectification of black (and brown) women's bodies is complicated not only by the history of slavery (yes, slavery existed in Puerto Rico) and those bodies in property, but also by rape." Mayra Rivera described the media attention around Lopez's body as provoking "primitivist fetishization", which evokes issues of "colonial sexualization of mestizaje". Jocelynne Scutt criticizes the fact that figures like Lopez "are seen as leading the 'trend'" of curvaceous bodies, "rather than linking it with its predominantly African source".

=== Ageing ===
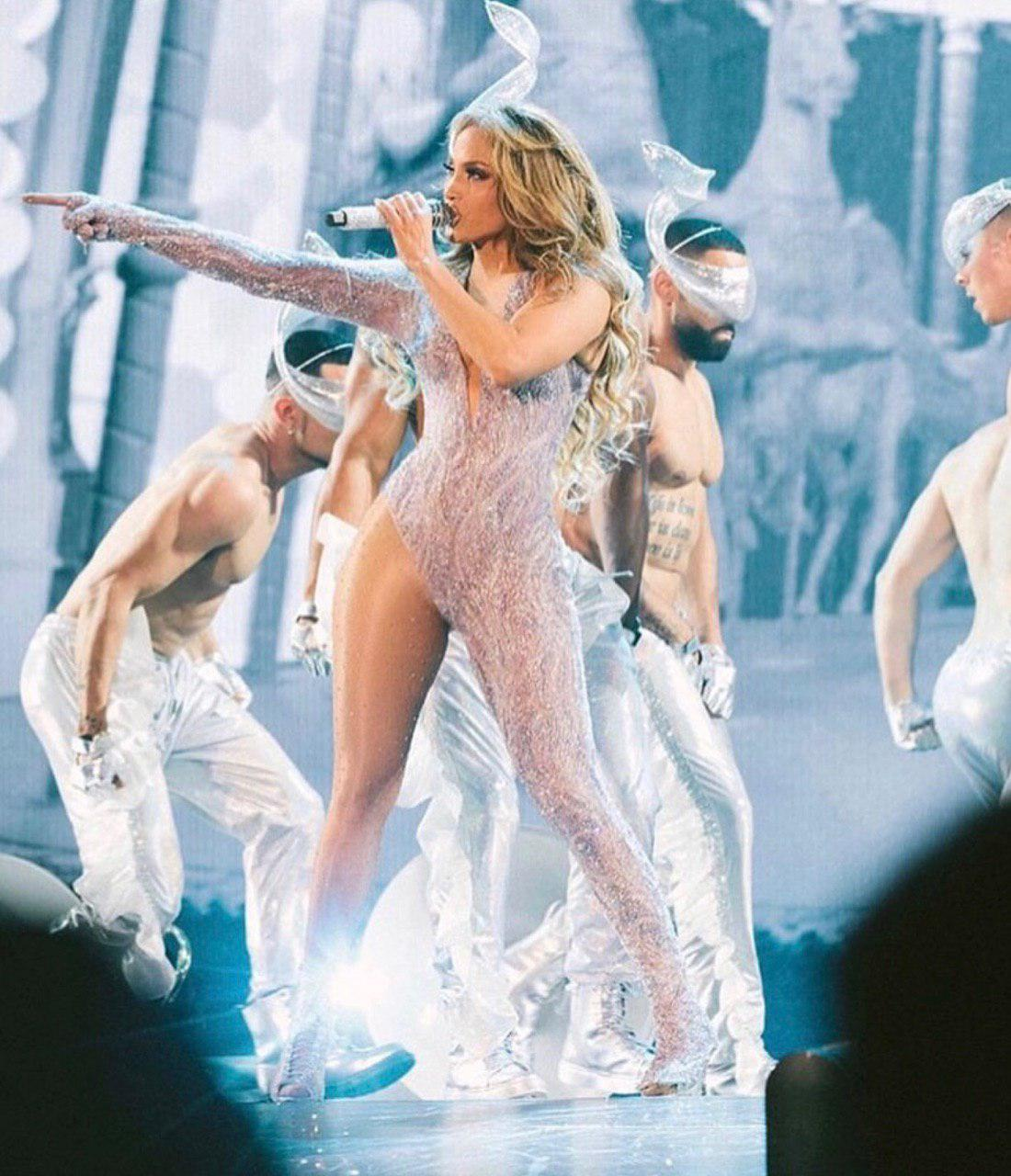
Lopez performing during her It's My Party tour, 2019

Lopez has been recognized for challenging and redefining norms around ageing, including through her fashion and stage performances. In 2019, she was outspoken about turning 50, launching a tour titled It's My Party to celebrate her birthday. Psychology Today noted: "She wants to make a statement on how women don’t stop existing after age fifty." Althea Legaspi of the Chicago Tribune wrote: "... in the entertainment world, sexism and ageism have hampered careers. But Lopez impressively defies convention."

Lopez generated admiration and debate after her Super Bowl LIV halftime show performance, where she wore revealing costumes and performed a pole dance routine. Samantha Brennan, a scholar of women's studies, wrote: "When I watched J.Lo slide across the stage and jump back up again and keep dancing, it was like watching Olympic athletes perform at their peak during competition. That J.Lo can still perform at that level at 50 provides hope for all us who want to keep on doing our best — in mid-life and beyond." Vanessa Friedman of The New York Times called it "an in-your-face demonstration of a woman glorying in her own physicality, and a dare to anyone who might render judgment based on a number." On the other hand, journalist Jennifer Weiner said she felt "personally judged" by Lopez's appearance, suggesting that it was an unrealistic representation of women in their 50s and celebrity bodies should be viewed "like art galleries".

In 2021, Lopez was identified as one of 10 celebrities whose personal style choices drive the greatest spikes in searches and news coverage for brands, being the only celebrity above 35. The Daily Telegraph called her the "world's most powerful" midlife celebrity in fashion. Friedman noted that Lopez was "fashion's favorite celebrity", having contracted with major brands like Versace, Coach and Guess, which is "no small thing in an industry famously obsessed by youth". Lopez became the oldest spokeswoman in Guess's history, which redefined the image of a "Guess girl" according to Vogue.

=== Sexuality and performances ===
Described by Billboard magazine as the "ultimate sex symbol" of the early 21st century, Lopez has routinely been ranked as the world's sexiest or most beautiful woman by different media publications. The Guardian noted that Lopez pushed "the boundaries of public sexuality" with her public appearances and fashion in the early 2000s. On stage and in her music videos, she has been noted for her sex appeal and provocative choreography. Lopez has been described as a "trendsetter in twenty-first century body politics", with scholar Michelle Gonzalez writing: "I don't know if Shakira and Beyoncé would have been able to shake it in our faces had Lopez not done so first."

Her provocative music videos and stage performances have also drawn scrutiny. Robin Givhan of The Daily Beast criticized Lopez's performance at the 2011 American Music Awards where she wore a nude bodysuit, stating that it "cried out for attention in all the wrong ways" and was "banal exhibitionism". In 2012, she received backlash for premiering her music video for "Dance Again" on the eleventh season of American Idol; the video, which depicts an orgy, caused a "frenzy" among conservative organizations and viewers. In May 2013, her performance on the finale of the television series Britain's Got Talent was deemed inappropriate for family-friendly television, and drew viewer complaints to Ofcom. Her 2020 Super Bowl performance drew over 1,300 complaints to the Federal Communications Commission, many of which criticized Lopez's pole dancing and "grabbing her crotch".

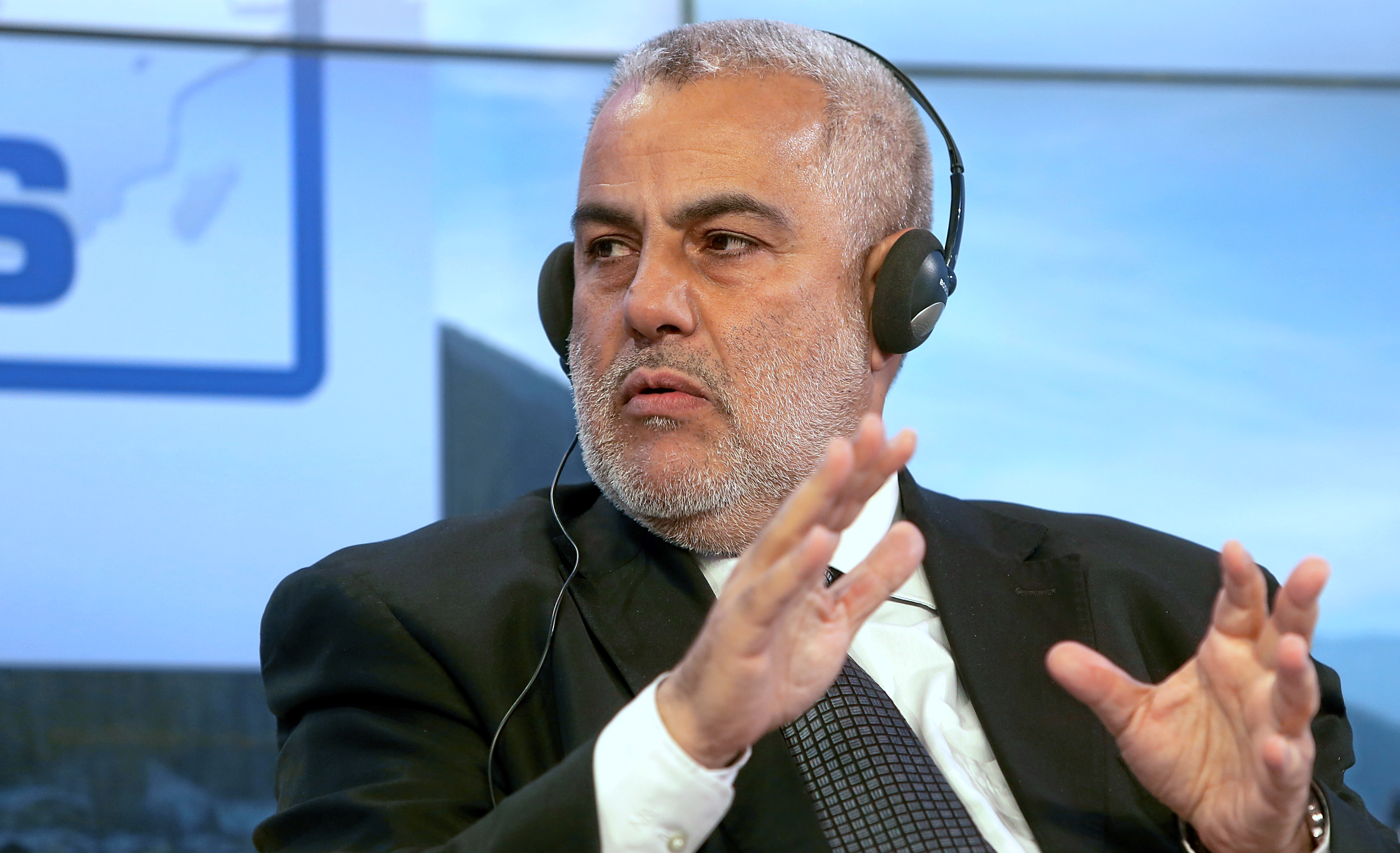
Moroccan Prime Minister Abdelilah Benkirane demanded legal action be taken following Lopez's "provocative" performance at Mawazine in 2015

In 2015, Lopez performed at the musical festival Mawazine in Morocco, where she generated controversy for her "suggestive" choreography and being "scantily dressed". Moroccan writer Leïla Slimani described the performance as pornographic. A Moroccan education group filed a lawsuit against Lopez, claiming her performance "disrupted public routine and stained the respect and integrity of Moroccan women", having been broadcast to over 2 million viewers. Members of the Islamic ruling party in Morocco at the time, and Minister of Communications Mustapha El Khalfi, said it was a "breach of public decency" and "goes against broadcasting law". Moroccan Prime Minister Abdelilah Benkirane later called it "indecent" and "disgraceful", and called for legal action to be taken against those responsible.

== Media coverage ==
Lopez has been a polarizing figure in popular culture. Jonathan Van Meter of Vogue described her as having "changed the face of modern celebrity." With her moniker J.Lo, Lopez started a trend of celebrities being given abbreviated nicknames. A tabloid fixture, much of the media coverage surrounding Lopez in the 2000s "focused on her dramatic private life". Negrón-Muntaner wrote that as early as 1999, she became "one of the easiest moving targets for cheap laughs as well as anxieties about working-class ‘loud’ sexuality and specifically Latino visibility." Despite this, Andrew Unterberger of Billboard described 2001 as "the peak of her all-consuming celebrity ... she was still America's sweetheart, still believable as a plucky rom-com underdog, still ultra-approachable even at her most glamorous." In 2002 and the years that ensued, however, Lopez was viewed as overexposed.

Throughout her career, she has received a bad reputation as being a demanding and outspoken "diva", something which Lopez has often denied, attributing it to sexism. Some of the backlash and fabricated tabloid stories surrounding Lopez have been attributed to her 1998 interview with Movieline, in which she was quoted as criticizing various actors and directors. Lopez, who "cried for hours" after the article was published, said the comments were made in jest and she was "so misquoted and so taken out of context". In 2003, Lawrence Donegan of The Guardian posited that misogyny and racism were to blame for her "bilious" coverage, writing: "Lopez must wonder what heinous crime she committed to become the most vilified woman in modern popular culture." In 2021, Ben Affleck said: "... sexist, racist, ugly vicious shit was written about her in ways that if you wrote it now, you would literally be fired for saying some of the things you said."

Lopez's popularity and chart success waned in the latter half of the 2000s. Her media coverage and public image later shifted when she joined American Idol in 2011, which was seen as humanizing her. People editor Peter Castro said American Idol made her "a celebrity of the people" whereas before, "there was a huge distance with the American public." Writing for CNN, Holly Thomas opined: "No matter what knocks her popularity or her credibility, she always wins her audience back. The noughties saw Lopez go from seemingly invincible to near laughingstock, and the 2010s saw her catapult herself back to superstardom."

=== Personal life ===
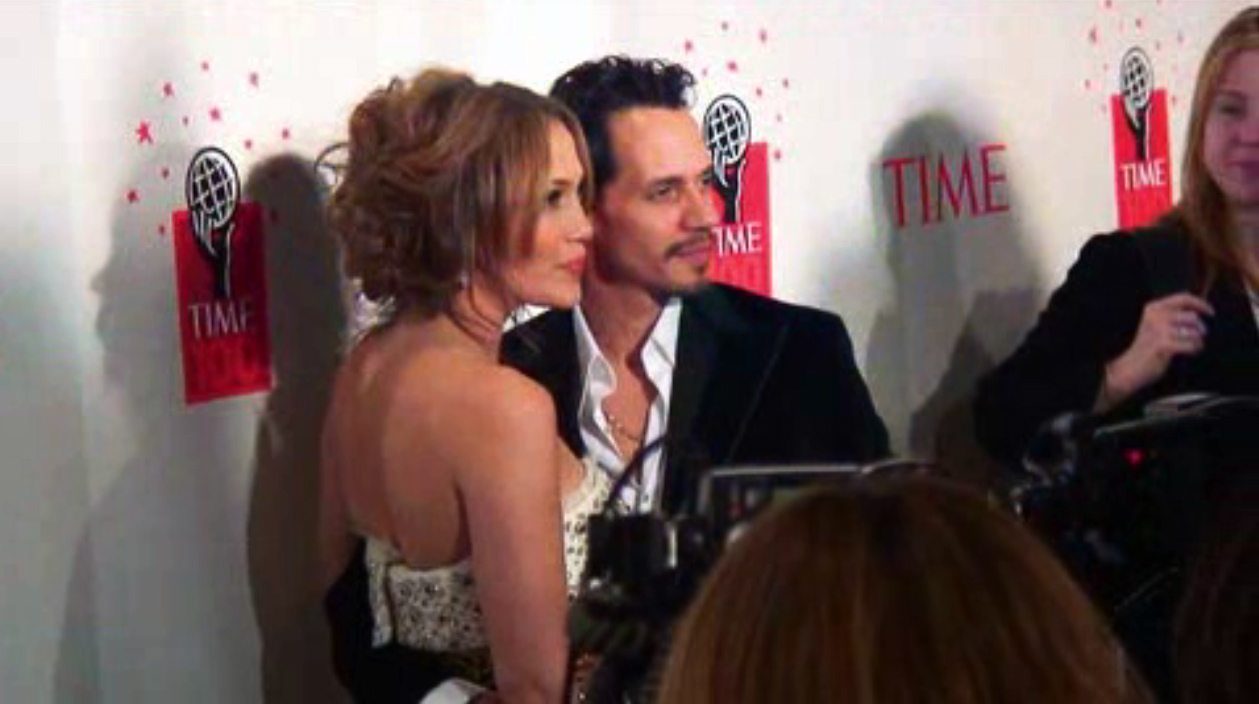
Lopez with her third husband Marc Anthony, 2006

Media coverage of Lopez's relationships has depicted her as "erratic, hyperemotional, tempestuous, flamboyant, and out of control." Lopez's high-profile relationship with Sean Combs was described as having "defined an age", with Vanity Fair writing that they entered "the pantheon of slightly notorious celebrity couples: Liz and Dick, Frank and Ava."

The relationship between Lopez and Ben Affleck was noted to have started the "2000s tabloid boom". Tabloids referred to the couple as "Bennifer", a portmanteau Vanity Fair described as "the first of that sort of tabloid branding". This subsequently created the trend of celebrity couple name blending. The 6.1-carat pink diamond ring from the couple's first engagement (2002) has been described as "the most talked about engagement ring" in modern times, prompting a surge in the popularity of colored diamonds and increasing the value of pink diamonds.

The negative media coverage of Lopez peaked during her first engagement to Affleck, which several commentators attributed to issues of race and class. Vanity Fair described the reaction as "moral panic", attributing it to "a perceived mismatch; how could a guy like him go for a girl like her, with all the racist baggage that implied." Affleck's appearance in Lopez's "Jenny from the Block" music video became notorious, with The Daily Telegraph writing: "On another level, considering this was an era when only men were encouraged to flaunt their conquests, J Lo’s boasts were political ... Here was a confident Latin woman with a trophy white male film star on her arm." Entrepreneur magazine said the couple's 2021 reunion "triggered a cultural earthquake". Following their marriage in 2022, Lopez changing her legal surname to Affleck generated widespread debate and polarized reactions, garnering both support and criticism from feminists.

Lopez and Marc Anthony were described as a "Latin power couple". Following the birth of their twins in 2008, they appeared with Lopez on the cover of People, which the magazine paid $6 million for; this became the most expensive celebrity photograph at the time.

== Fashion ==
Considered a fashion icon, Lopez is known for her sense of style and "breaking fashion rules". She is recognized for her "bold" red carpet fashion and her everyday street style, which is "discussed ad infinitum by the fashion press." British Vogue said she "added megawatt glamour to every outfit she wore". Early in her career, her "curve-hugging" fashion sense was described as "revolutionary" and "unconventional".

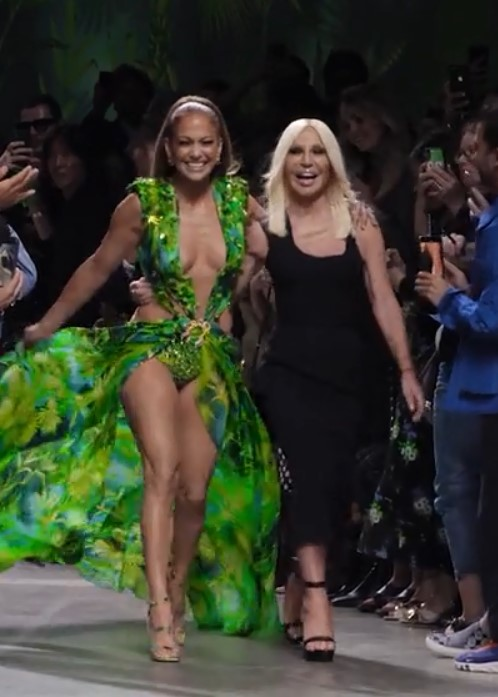
Lopez (left), wearing an updated version of her iconic green Versace dress, and Donatella Versace (right) in 2019

Recognized for her influence on fashion, the Council of Fashion Designers of America presented Lopez with its Fashion Icon Award in 2019 for her "long-standing and global impact on fashion". Her green Versace "Jungle Dress" was voted the fifth most iconic red carpet dress of all time in a poll run by The Daily Telegraph. The dress had a significant impact on the fashion industry, celebrity endorsements, and the evolution of red carpet fashion. The images of Lopez wearing the dress became the most popular search query of all time at that point, and subsequently led to the creation of Google's image search. Donatella Versace credited Lopez wearing the dress with "reviving" the Versace brand after the death of her brother, Gianni Versace.

Lopez has been credited with popularizing various fashion trends and brands throughout her career, including velour shorts, baby pink coats, Juicy Couture tracksuits, cargo pants, newsboy caps, athleisure wear, and nude clothing. She also sparked beauty trends including sunless tanning, monochromatic makeup, contouring and mink eyelashes. Vogue wrote that "Lopez was deciding Y2K beauty at its origin point". In 2004, she inspired a trend of curvier mannequins being manufactured, with mannequin designers such as Ralph Pucci basing their designs on her body. This fuelled a rise in sales for manufacturers and retailers.

Lopez has been in demand as a fashion brand ambassador. In the early 2000s, her personal style choices had a direct bearing on sales in the fashion industry, with the Chicago Tribune writing: "More than abstract entertainment, her style influence goes straight to the bottom line." The success of Louis Vuitton's fall 2003 campaign, for which Lopez was the brand's model, led to an influx of Hollywood stars "becoming image models of fashion and cosmetic labels". Her appearance at Milan Fashion Week in September 2019, wearing an updated version of green Versace dress, generated over $31.8 million in total media impact value. After she wore a white Chanel coat at the 2021 presidential inauguration, searches for "long white coats" grew by 119%.

== Business and branding ==
The more assimilated consumers find her strategic business acumen is very inspiring, where as the less acculturated Hispanic consumer identifies more with her rags to riches story. She’s a true superstar, and her star power among the other Latina celebrities, whether it’s Shakira or Selena Gomez or Eva Longoria, has true crossover appeal.

— Branding expert Jeetendr Sehdev, Billboard (2013)

The J.Lo brand has been described as one of the "most complex" in the world.

Described as a "branding pioneer", Lopez is said to have ushered in a new era of celebrity branding. In Icons of American Popular Culture (2009), Robert C. Cottrell described Lopez as a "multidimensional artist who had turned into a financial powerhouse". Vogue wrote that she broadened "the possibilities of what a superstar can be: a global brand", while Adweek observed that Lopez began building her personal brand at a time when "'personal brand' was not yet part of the cultural lexicon". She has also been described as a "corporate entity", and a "walking lifestyle brand", with The Guardian writing in 2003: "Jennifer Lopez was no longer Jennifer Lopez; she was bootylicious J-Lo the actress, musician, the perfume, the clothes label, the handbag."

Journalists have noted Lopez's diversification strategy and multimedia focus, and creating a "new standard of fame marked by self-branding and multidisciplinary ambitions". Salon.com said Lopez understood "that she could parlay her time in the public eye in various directions." In 2013, Forbes wrote: "She's everywhere– from cosmetics and automobiles, to catering and telecommunications. Over the past few years, JLo has grown into one of the most complex brands in the world." According to Ann Powers of Slate, Lopez "pioneered 21st century stardom by being an excellent floater, welcome in every entertainment stream from film to dance to fashion, but unwilling to settle within any of them."

Her first fragrance, Glow by JLo, influenced the rise of celebrity fragrances in the 2000s, an industry which had been dormant. Perfume critic Chandler Burr wrote: "Elizabeth Taylor was one of the first [to have her own scent], but Glow kicked the whole thing into overdrive." Her fragrance line became the most successful celebrity line in the world, with sales exceeding $2 billion as of 2012. Lopez was one of the first celebrities to have a lifestyle brand, and her clothing brand was one of the first celebrity fashion lines; scholar Aida Hurtado wrote that she "redefined how fashion is produced and entwined with other artistic endeavors", influencing other artists to adopt a similar approach.

== Politics ==
Lopez has worked with U.S. politicians on a number of occasions. In 2009, she met with House Speaker Nancy Pelosi and Congresswoman Nydia Velázquez on Capitol Hill to "discuss education in the Latino community and college affordability legislation". In 2013, she met with the Congressional Hispanic Caucus, the National Council of La Raza and Senators Harry Reid and Bob Menendez to lobby for greater diversity and representation of Latinos in television programming. She also spoke at the NCTA's The Cable Show convention, where she said there is "a media and cultural revolution of Latinos here in the United States. We're realizing our power."

Lopez sampled a speech from Hillary Clinton in her music video for "Ain't Your Mama", which received praise from Clinton. Clinton also used "Let's Get Loud" throughout her 2016 presidential campaign, and Lopez appeared alongside Clinton in an interview after endorsing her.

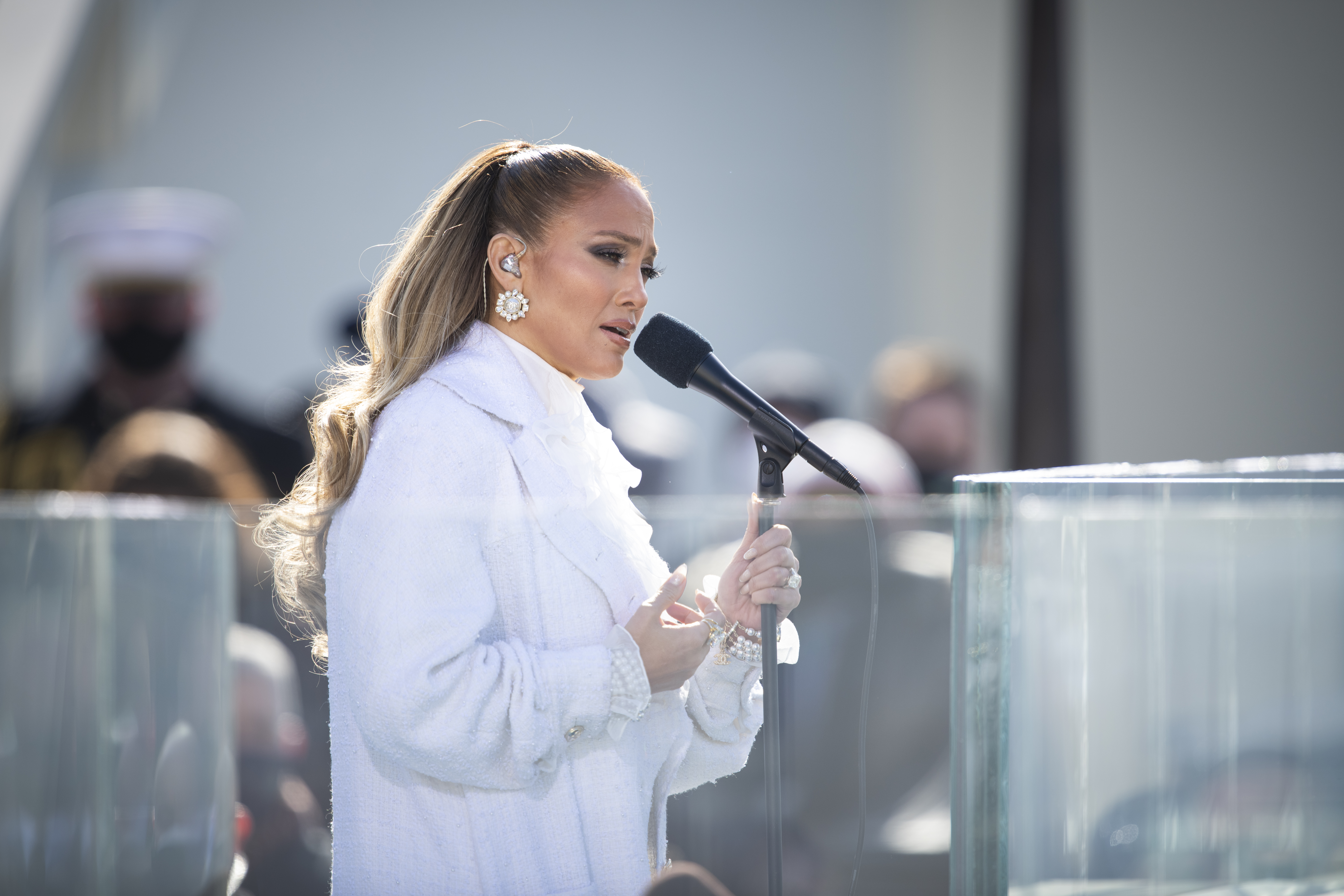
Lopez performing at the inauguration of Joe Biden in 2021

Lopez was outspoken in her criticism of President Donald Trump during his presidency. During her Super Bowl halftime show performance in 2020, she performed "Let's Get Loud" while cloaked in a large Puerto Rican flag, with children in metal cages displayed on the field. It was interpreted as a statement about the Mexico–United States border crisis, Trump's immigration policy, and his response to Hurricane Maria. The NFL attempted to remove the cages from the performance but Lopez refused. She later performed at the inauguration of Joe Biden in 2021, where she sang "This Land Is Your Land" and "America the Beautiful", while reciting the last phrase of the Pledge of Allegiance in Spanish. She also worked "Let's Get Loud" into the performance as a "reprise" to her political message at the Super Bowl. Scholar Carlos Vargas-Ramos from the Centro de Estudios Puertorriqueños found Lopez's performance symbolic, stating that it helped raise awareness for Puerto Rico.

=== Controversies ===
In 2013, Lopez controversially performed for President Gurbanguly Berdimuhamedow of Turkmenistan, an authoritarian ruler accused of widespread human rights violations. Lopez's publicist said she was unaware of the country's human rights record. It emerged that the performance was organized by the China National Petroleum Corporation, as a possible bribe by the Chinese government to "boost access to abundant gas supplies in Turkmenistan". In 2024, she received backlash for receiving a reported $5 million to perform in the United Arab Emirates, where homosexuality is illegal; politician Peter Tatchell called it "sad that a long-time LGBTQ ally like Jennifer Lopez is prepared to put money before human rights."

== Sources ==
- Reyes, Luis (2000). Hispanics in Hollywood: A Celebration of 100 Years in Film and Television. iFilm Publishing/Lone Eagle. ISBN 978-1-58065-025-0.
- Marquez, Herón (2001). Latin Sensations. Twenty-First Century Books. ISBN 9780822549932.
- Rivera, Raquel Z. (February 7, 2003). New York Ricans from the Hip Hop Zone. Palgrave Macmillan. ISBN 9781403981677.
- Negrón-Muntaner, Frances (2004). Boricua pop: Puerto Ricans and the latinization of American culture. New York: New York Univ. Press. ISBN 0814758185.
- Deanne, Stacy; Kenyatta, Kelly; Lowery, Natasha (2005). Sanders, Kwynn (ed.). Alicia Keys, Ashanti, Beyoncé, Destiny's Child, Jennifer Lopez & Mya: Divas of the New Millennium. Amber Books Publishing. ISBN 9780974977966.
- Navarro, Armando (July 14, 2005). Mexicano Political Experience in Occupied Aztlan: Struggles and Change. AltaMira Press. ISBN 9780759114746.
- Mendible, Myra (2007). From Bananas to Buttocks: The Latina Body in Popular Film and Culture. University of Texas Press. ISBN 9780292714939.
- Redmond, Sean (2007). Holmes, Su (ed.). Stardom and Celebrity: A Reader. SAGE. pp. 282–283. ISBN 978-1446202388.
- Shugart, Helene A. (May 8, 2007). "Crossing Over: Hybridity and Hegemony in the Popular Media". Communication and Critical/Cultural Studies. 4 (2). National Communication Association: 115–141. doi:10.1080/14791420701296505.
- Nakamura, Lisa (2008). Digitizing Race: Visual Cultures of the Internet. University of Minnesota Press. ISBN 978-0-8166-4612-8.
- Bruns, Roger (August 30, 2008). Icons of Latino America: Latino Contributions to American Culture, Volume 1 and 2. Greenwood Publishing Group. ISBN 9781573567961.
- Tracy, Kathleen A. (September 30, 2008). Jennifer Lopez: A Biography. Greenwood Publishing Group. ISBN 9780313355165.
- Cottrell, Robert C. (2009). Icons of American Popular Culture: From P. T. Barnum to Jennifer Lopez. M. E. Sharpe. ISBN 9780765628350.
- Pinn, Anthony B.; Valentin, Benjamin (November 11, 2009). Creating Ourselves: African Americans and Hispanic Americans on Popular Culture and Religious Expression. Duke University Press. ISBN 9780822391210.
- Parish, James Robert (2009). Jennifer Lopez. New York: Infobase Publishing. ISBN 9781438111919.
- Riley, Sam G. (2010). Star Struck: An Encyclopedia of Celebrity Culture. ABC-CLIO. ISBN 9780313358135.
- Ovalle, Priscilla Peña (2011). Dance and the Hollywood Latina: Race, Sex, and Stardom. Rutgers University Press. ISBN 978-0813548807.
- Lopez, Jennifer (2014). True Love. Celebra. ISBN 9780451468680.
- Woog, Adam (2020). The Great Hispanic Heritage Series: Jennifer Lopez, Updated Edition. Infobase Publishing. ISBN 9781438197999.
