= Rebecca Moses =

American fashion designer

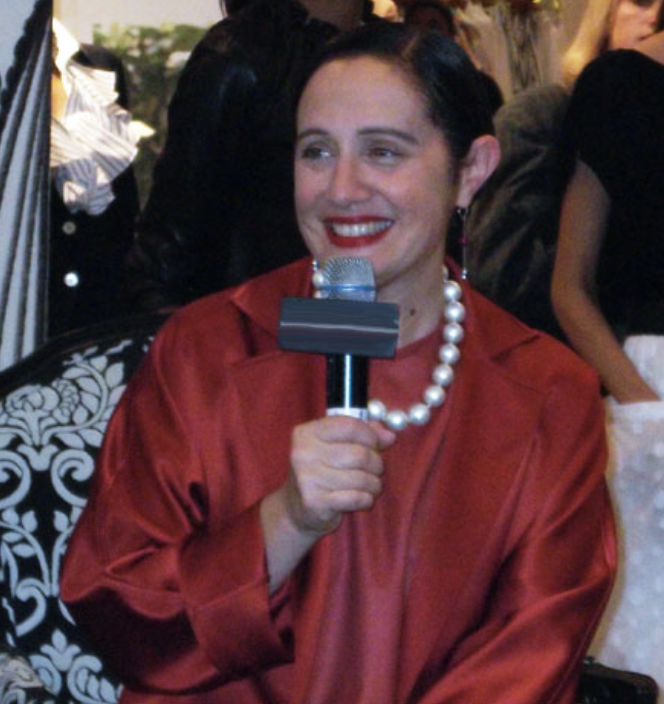
- Moses in 2011
- Born: Rebecca Moses; July 14, 1958 (age 68); North Bergen, New Jersey, U.S.
- Citizenship: United States (1958–present); Italian (1990–present)
- Education: Fashion Institute of Technology
- Years active: 1990–present
- Website: www.rebeccamoses.com

Rebecca Moses (born July 14, 1958) is an American fashion designer, illustrator, author based in New York City.

== Early life and education ==
Rebecca Moses was born and raised in North Bergen, New Jersey. Moses attended the Fashion Institute of Technology in New York City. Moses moved to Italy in 1990 where she met her husband Giacomo Festa Bianchet. In 2010, Moses relocated with her two children to New York City.

== Career ==
=== Fashion design ===
Moses developed her first collection at age 21; as one of the first American designers to enter the European market when she moved to Italy in 1992, she closed her New York-based design company and replaced Gianni Versace as designer for Donatella Girombelli's clothing label Genny Collection and Genny Platinum in 1993. Moses continued as a consultant for Genny and Genny Platinum for some years until she developed her new label in 1996.

A week after developing her new label in 1996, Moses opened up more than 100 accounts, including Joyce in Hong Kong; Bergdorf Goodman; Neiman Marcus; Barneys New York in Japan; Harvey Nichols and Browns in London; Janet Brown and Maxfield's in the United States; Pupi Solari and Marisa in Milan; Eichoff's and Theresa in Germany; and Victoire in Paris.

=== Illustration and Art ===
In 2010, Moses began working on illustration projects for Italian Vogue and other global publications, such as Vogue Japan, Icon, and Marie Claire. Moses began shifting her fashion career to painting and illustration for fashion, beauty, and lifestyle brands such as Alcantara, MAC Cosmetics, Panerai, Saks Fifth Avenue, Vera Wang, Ralph Pucci, Fratelli Rossetti, and La Furla.

In 2020 during the COVID-19 pandemic, Moses created a social media campaign with illustrations and letters of nurses and women around the world that was showcased as an exhibit at Mount Sinai Hospital in New York City.

In December 2021, Moses created murals for the Ralph Pucci building during Art Basel. The exhibit, titled "Bubblegum, Lipstick, and Hope," reflected themes of hope, passion, and determination. Her exhibitions often celebrate individuality, diversity, and the female essence.

In 2024, Moses debuted her exhibition "Bohemian Gardens" at the Ralph Pucci International Gallery. This series of paintings explores themes of individuality, fantasy, and the blending of reality with vibrant, kaleidoscopic hues. The works feature semi-clad, bejeweled figures set against lush garden backdrops, celebrating the intersection of nature and human creativity.

=== Publications ===
In 2010, Moses published "A Life of Style," a book featuring her watercolors and wisdom on developing personal style. The book explores questions about the nature of style and how it evolves.

=== Personal life ===
Rebecca Moses resides in New York City, where she continues to create and inspire through her diverse body of work. Her career has been marked by resilience and adaptability, often drawing from personal experiences to fuel her artistic endeavors.

== Exhibitions ==
Moses has held numerous exhibitions, including "Perfectly Imperfect," "White Shirts," and "Bohemian Gardens," which showcase her unique style and focus on diverse, multicultural representations of women.

== Books ==
- Rebecca Moses, A Life Of Style: Fashion, Home, Entertainment, The Monacelli Press, October 2010 (ISBN 9780688162566).
