= Illuminated mannequin =

Illuminated mannequins are a home decor piece that were popular in the 1970s and 1980s in the United States. Although niche items of decor, their less known style was a symbol in 70s fashion and home furnishing.

An illuminated mannequin is a full or part body mannequin which illuminates from inside as an alternative to floor lamps.

The illuminated mannequin was originally manufactured and released by Adel Rootstein as a decorative counterpart to her widely successful Twiggy Mannequin. Rootstein became well-known thanks to the success of the Twiggy mannequin, and the illuminated mannequin followed as a lesser known counterpart in its wake.

Adel Rootstein has gifted her home décor mannequins to musicians and actors which she is inspired by, as mentioned briefly in an interview with Stevie Nicks in 1983.

There have been various celebrity photographs taken in which the illuminated mannequins can be seen in the celebrities homes, most notably Stevie Nicks of Fleetwood Mac and Michael Jackson.

The illuminated mannequin is quoted as an early inspiration to Ralph Pucci of the Pucci Mannequins. Pucci's mannequin display ‘THE ART OF THE MANNEQUIN’ at the Museum of Arts and Design (MAD) had an illuminated mannequin form amongst the many models in his display. From March 31 to August 30, 2015, thirty of Pucci's most memorable mannequins were on display for museum goers. Finding the exhibition, “extremely gratifying,” Pucci was thrilled that the visual industry is getting a shining moment in a museum whose mission is to “document contemporary and historic innovation in craft, art, and design.”
