= Lisa Armstrong (writer) =

British author and journalist

Lisa Armstrong OBE is a British author and journalist. She is Head of Fashion of The Daily Telegraph. She was awarded an OBE in 2022 for services to fashion.

== Early life and education ==
Born in the UK, Armstrong grew up in Dorset in the sixties and seventies, where she says that "fashion didn't really exist". She graduated in 1984 from the University of Bristol, where she studied English and French Literature, then journalism at City, University of London. In 2011, she was awarded an honorary doctorate by the University of the Arts London. In 2002, Armstrong was awarded with Fashion Journalist of the Year at the Fashion Awards. In 2017, she was presented with the Fashion Journalist of the Year award by the Press Association, which she was also presented with in 2019.

== Journalism ==
After graduating, Armstrong was offered a job at Elle UK after her freelance writing work was spotted by the then-editor Sally Brampton. From there, she moved to British edition of Vogue, working under Liz Tilberis, and made her way from fashion writer to fashion features director. She was Fashion Editor of The Independent before returning to Vogue under Alexandra Shulman. Prior to her role at Telegraph, she held the fashion editor post at The Times. Armstrong is a contributor to Harper's Bazaar, for whom she published her 2011 style manual.

In 2000, Armstrong was the fashion journalist chosen by the Fashion Museum, Bath to choose that year's most representative outfit for their Dress of the Year collection. She decided on the green chiffon dress designed by Donatella Versace and famously worn by Jennifer Lopez. Armstrong used her expertise to argue that this dress, which received a great deal of media attention through being worn by Lopez, Geri Halliwell, and others, represented "some kind of high water mark in the current symbiosis between fashion and celebrity." She is known for accessibly written articles which show a keen eye and a sense of wit, and for being unafraid to express controversial opinions, such as criticising the Yves Saint Laurent brand for its multiple name changes. Since 2015, she has also written a beauty column in The Telegraph.

Armstrong was appointed Officer of the Order of the British Empire (OBE) in the 2022 New Year Honours for services to fashion.

== Novels ==
Armstrong has written four novels. Elle reviewed her first novel, Front Row, as "Has all the juice of a Jackie Collins plus the kind of fash pack details that Armstrong, as fashion features director at Vogue, knows all about." In contrast, the Birmingham Post thought it was amusing, affectionate and indulgent. Armstrong herself commented on Front Row: "It would've been hypocritical of me to do a complete annihilation job. I still work in that world and although it can be absurd and stupid sometimes I just found it funnier the more I observed and wrote about it."

Her other novels are Dead Stylish (2001), Bad Manors (2004) and Déjà View (2005).

== Bibliography ==
- Front Row (1998)
- Dead Stylish (2001)
- Bad Manors (2004)
- Déjà View (2005)
