= From Bananas to Buttocks =

2007 collection of essays

From Bananas to Buttocks: The Latina Body in Popular Film and Culture
- Author: Myra Mendible (editor)
- Language: English
- Subject: Latina women Film; Culture
- Genre: Non-fiction
- Published: 2007
- Publisher: University of Texas Press
- Publication place: United States
- Media type: Print (hardback, paperback), e-book
- Pages: 336 pages
- ISBN: 0292714920

From Bananas to Buttocks: The Latina Body in Popular Film and Culture is a 2007 non-fiction collection of essays that was edited by Myra Mendible. The book was published through the University of Texas Press and examines the roles and impact of depictions of Latina women in film and culture.

== Content ==
The book collects essays from several academics and authorities and is prefaced by an introduction by the collection's editor, Mendible. The essays are split into three sections, each of which examine a different aspect of Latinas in film and culture. Some essays examine specific performers such as Lupe Vélez.

- Section One: Case Studies: Silent and Classic Film Era
  1. "Film Viewing in Latino Communities, 1896-1934: Puerto Rico as Microcosm" by Clara E. Rodríguez
  2. "Lupe Vélez: Queen of the B's" by Rosa-Linda Fregoso
  3. "Lupe Vélez Regurgitated: Cautionary, Indigestion-Causing Ruminations on "Mexicans" in "American" Toilets Perpetrated While Covetously Screening "Veronica"" by William A. Nericcio
- Section Two. Performing Bodies: Contemporary Film and Music Media
  1. "Celia's Shoes" by Frances Negrón-Muntaner
  2. "Salma Hayek's Frida: Transnational Latina Bodies in Popular Culture" by Isabel Molina Guzmán
  3. "Is Penelope to J.Lo as Culture Is to Nature? Eurocentric Approaches to "Latin" Beauties" by Angharad Valdivia
  4. "Jennifer Lopez: The New Wave of Border Crossing" by Tara Lockhart
  5. ""There's My Territory": Shakira Crossing Over" by Cynthia Fuchs
  6. ""Hey, Killer": The Construction of a Macho Latina, or the Perils and Enticements of Girlfight" by Karen R. Tolchin
- Section Three. Sensational Bodies: Discourses of Latina Femininity
1. "On the Semiotics of Lorena Bobbitt" by Charla Ogaz
2. "Disorderly Bodies and Discourses of Latinidad in the Elián González Story" as Isabel Molina Guzmán
3. "The Body in Question: The Latina Detective in the Lupe Solano Mystery Series" by Ana Patricia Rodríguez
4. La Princesa Plástica: Hegemonic and Oppositional Representations of Latinidad in Hispanic Barbie" by Karen Goldman
5. "Chusmas, Chismes, y Escándalos: Latinas Talk Back to El Show de Cristina and Laura en América" by Viviana Rojas

== Reception ==
From Bananas to Buttocks received reviews from the NWSA Journal, Hispanic American Historical Review, and Latino Studies.
