= Rosa-Linda Fregoso =

American academic

Rosa-Linda Fregoso is the Professor and former Chair of Latin American and Latino Studies at the University of California, Santa Cruz.

== Biography ==
Fregoso was born in Corpus Christi, Texas. She received her Bachelor of Journalism degree from the University of Texas at Austin, and her Ph.D. in Comparative Studies: Language, Society and Culture from the University of California, San Diego, where she studied under American media critic and scholar, Herbert Schiller, and literary scholar, Rosaura Sánchez.

Before pursuing a career in academia, she was a television and radio journalist. From 1977-79, she produced and hosted Telecorpus, a daily talk show that aired on KORO-TV in Corpus Christi. She later moved to Austin, Texas, and from 1979–82, she produced and hosted a weekly radio program, The Mexican American Experience, for the Longhorn Radio Network and KUT-FM (a National Public Radio affiliate). The Mexican-American Experience was the first nationally syndicated radio program dealing with Mexican-American issues to air on public and commercial radio programs. It was the predecessor to KUT-FM's Latino USA (launched in 1993), a radio program that Fregoso contributed to as a film critic in its early years.

== Awards and honors ==
Fregoso has won a number of honors and awards, including a Ford Foundation Postdoctoral Fellowship (1990); the Rockefeller Foundation Resident Scholar award (1997); and the MLA Book Prize (2004) for meXicana encounters: The Making of Social Identities on the Borderlands.

Fregoso currently lives in Oakland, California.

== Published works ==
=== Books ===
- Terrorizing Women: Feminicide in the Américas (2010), co-edited with Cynthia Bejarano, Duke University Press. ISBN 978-0-8223-4681-4
- meXicana encounters: The Making of Social Identities on the Borderlands (2003), University of California Press. ISBN 978-0-520-23890-9
- Lourdes Portillo: The Devil Never Sleeps and Other Films (2001), University of Texas Press. ISBN 978-0-292-72525-6
- Miradas de mujer (1998), co-edited with Norma Iglesias. ISBN 978-968-6075-77-9
- The Bronze Screen: Chicana and Chicano Film Culture (1993), University of Minnesota Press. ISBN 978-0-8166-2136-1

=== Chapters in books ===
- (2009) "Lupe Vélez: Queen of the Bs," From Bananas to Buttocks: The Latina Body in Popular Film and Culture, edited by Myra Mendible, Austin: University of Texas Press.
- (2007) "Fantasy Heritage: Tracking Latina Bloodlines," Latino Studies Companion, edited by Juan Flores and Renato Rosaldo, Blackwell Press.
- (2006) "Toward a Planetary Civil Society", Women in the U.S.-Mexico Borderlands: Structural Violence and Agency in Everyday Life, edited by Denise Segura and Patricia Zavella, Duke University Press.
- (2003) "Reproduction and Miscegenation on the Borderlands: Mapping the Maternal Body of Tejanas", Chicana Feminisms: A Critical Reader, co-edited with Aída Hurtado, Olga Nájera-Ramírez, Norma Klahn and Pat Zavella, Duke University Press.
- (2003) "In the Time of the Butterflies" Julia Alvarez, Reading U.S. Latina Writers, edited by Alvina Quintana, Palgrave MacMillan. (Paperback edition 2005)
- (2001) "California Filming: Re-imagining the Nation," Parallels and Intersections: A Remarkable History of Women Artists in California 1950–2000, edited by Diana Fuller, University of California Press.
- (2001) "Devils and Ghosts, Mothers and Immigrants: A Critical Retrospective of the Works of Lourdes Portillo", Lourdes Portillo: The Devil Never Sleeps and Other Films, edited by Rosa Linda Fregoso, Austin: University of Texas Press, pp. 81–101.
- (1999) "Sacando los Trapos al Sol (Airing Dirty Laundry) in Lourdes Portillo's 'The Devil Never Sleeps'", Redirecting the Gaze: Third World Women Filmmakers, edited by Diana Robin and Ira Jaffe, SUNY Press.

=== Selected articles ===
- (2010) "Witnessing and the Poetics of Corporality", Kalfou, Vol. 1, No. 1, pp. 21–31.
- (2010) "Maquilapolis: An Interview with Vicky Funari and Sergio de la Torre" (Interview and Introduction), Camera Obscura, Vol. 25, No. 2, pp. 173–81.
- (2009) "Las queremos vivas!" La política y la cultura de los derechos humanos, Debate Feminista, Vol. 39, pp. 209–243, Mexico City.
- (2007) "The Disasters of Border Crossing" (Internet news blog), Truthdig. (Posted on September 7, 2007.)
- (2007) "We Want Them Alive!: The Culture and Politics of Human Rights" (Keynote Address), Berkeley Journal of Gender, Law & Justice (formerly Berkeley Women's Law Journal), Vol. 22, pp. 367–79.
- (2006) "’We Want Them Alive!’: The Politics and Culture of Human Rights," Social Identities, Vol. 12, No. 2 (March issue).
- (2006) "The Complexities of 'Feminicide' on the Border", Color of Violence: The Incite! Anthology, Incite! Women of Color Against Violence, Cambridge, South End Press, pp. 130–4.
- (2006) "Introduction: Chicano/a Cultural Representations: Reframing Alternative Critical Discourse," The Chicana/o Cultural Studies Reader, edited by Angie Chabram-Dernersesian, London: Routledge, pp. 24–30.
- (2000) "Voices Without Echo: The Global Gendered Apartheid," Emergences: Journal for the Study of Media and Composite Cultures, Vol. 10, No. 1.
- (1999) "Imagining Multiculturalism: Race and Sexuality on the Tejas Borderlands," The Review of Education/Pedagogy/Cultural Studies, Vol. 21, No. 2.
- (1999) "On the Road With Angela Davis," Cultural Studies, Vol. 13, No. 2 (April issue).
- (1995) "Homegirls, Cholas, and Pachucas in Cinema: Taking Over the Public Sphere", California History (Fall issue).
