= Angie Chabram-Dernersesian =

Angie Chabram-Dernersesian is professor emeritus at the University of California, Davis.

== Life ==
She was raised by her mother and grew up in the San Gabriel Valley in California along with three siblings. She attended Bishop Amat Memorial High School. In 1976, she graduated from the University of California, Berkeley with a Bachelor of Arts in Spanish.

Under the direction of Rosaura Sánchez she pursued doctoral studies in the fields of Chicana/o, Mexican, and Latin American literature at the University of California, San Diego. She was hired by the University of California, Davis in 1984.

At UC Davis, Chabram-Dernersesian worked with students in the Spanish for Native Speakers Program and developed the Chicana/o Literature Series. She also worked to develop the Chicana/o Studies Program and its acquisition of departmental status. As an Assistant Professor Chabram-Dernersesian was awarded a postdoctoral fellowship at the Institute of American Cultures/The Chicana/o Research Center. In 1990, she edited a special issue of the journal, Cultural Studies, in conjunction with Professor Rosa Linda Fregoso.

In 2006, Chabram-Dernersesian edited The Chicana/o Cultural Studies Reader (Routledge), which introduces readers to the contentious dialogues and alternative legacies of (Chicana/o) cultural studies with various critical entries. In 2007 she published what can be seen as a companion text: The Chicana/o Cultural Studies Forum. This Forum, which is the result of a number of interviews obtained and edited by Chabram-Dernersesian, includes introductions on the topic and a spoken intellectual history of the practices of Chicana/o cultural studies, particularly in the US. In addition, this edited book incorporates comparative context with the inclusion of interventions of practitioners from Black, American, Latina/o, Asian American, and Mexican cultural studies.

== Publications ==
- Speaking from the Body: Latinas on Health and Culture. University of Arizona Press. 2008. ISBN 9780816526642.
- The Chicana/o Cultural Studies Forum: Critical and Ethnographic Practices. NYU Press. 2007. ISBN 9780814716311.
- The Chicana/o Cultural Studies Reader. Psychology Press. 2006. ISBN 9780415235167.
- "Introduction: Chicana/o Latina/o : Transnational and Transdisciplinary Movements". Cultural Studies. 13 (2). Routledge. April 1999. doi:10.1080/095023899335220. ISBN 9780415197960.
- "Introduction: Chicano Cultural Representations: Reframing Alternative Critical Discourse". Cultural Studies. 4 (2). Routledge. October 1990. ISBN 9780415052771.
