= Black Versace dress of Elizabeth Hurley =

Dress worn by Elizabeth Hurley

- Artist: Versace
- Year: 1994
- Type: "Safety-pin" black Versace dress

English actress and model Elizabeth Hurley wore a black Versace dress, often referred to as "THAT Dress", when she accompanied Hugh Grant to the premiere of Four Weddings and a Funeral in 1994. The dress was held together by several oversized gold safety pins. The dress is one of Versace's best-known creations, along with Jennifer Lopez's green dress, which had served as the inspiration for Google Image Search. It is considered by some to be largely responsible for launching Hurley onto the global media stage.

== Background ==
In advance of the premiere for Four Weddings and a Funeral and as a newcomer to high profile premieres, Grant had been told that he and his partner would be able to borrow designer clothing to wear to such an event.

Inexperienced in such matters and relatively unknown, Hurley contacted various fashion houses asking for such a loan but was rebuffed several times because they did not know who she was.

On contacting the Versace Flagship Store on Old Bond Street, Hurley spoke to Dean Aslett, Head of Womenswear and Atelier, and who was also at that time in charge of dresses lent out for press and promotional purposes. He agreed to do Hurley a favour and lend her a dress.

Recognising the favour, Hurley gave Aslett four tickets for the premiere of Four Weddings and a Funeral that was taking place that very night. Aslett attended the premiere with the Gianni Versace store director, Sonja Boras, and two other Versace employees, Cosimo Brancaccio and Adolpho Alvarado.

== Design ==
The black dress was made from pieces of silk and lycra fabric, with oversized gold safety pins at "strategical places". The dress was wide open at the front, from the neck down to halfway across the bosom, with two slimline straps on the shoulders. Each side featured a cut-away part, held together with six gold safety pins along the side, and one at the top of either cut-away, connecting it to the bosom section. The dress is said to be punk-inspired, "neo-punk", and sari-inspired, something which "emerged from the sari development" according to Gianni Versace himself.

== Influence ==
The dress is perhaps Versace's best-known creation, after Jennifer Lopez's green dress, as it received considerable global coverage in newspapers and magazines around the world for a long time after the event and was credited with boosting Hurley's profile, propelling her from being almost unknown to worldwide media recognition. Hurley has also been credited with making the Versace fashion brand a household name. The brand has since, with its omnipresent Medusa-head logo, "defined the paradoxes of a controversial, new-generation feminism which celebrates empowerment in the act of attracting and manipulating a male gaze." The dress topped a 2008 Debenhams' poll that asked 3,000 women to select their favourite iconic red-carpet dress. The dress was also celebrated for revolutionizing acceptable attire at red-carpet events, making it more acceptable for other actresses and celebrities to be more daring.

Some viewed the dress as too lewd or distastefully revealing, but Hurley replied that "Unlike many other designers, Versace designs clothes to celebrate the female form rather than eliminate it."

On Friday 17 March 1995, comedian Dawn French wore a copy of the dress (over a white vest) in a sketch for the Comic Relief telethon where she kissed Hugh Grant.

In 2007, a copy of the dress worn by Hurley was put on sale for the first time – with a price tag of £10,690 – at Harrods, as part of an exhibition at the London store, dedicated to "the little black dress." The exhibition included the famous black dress worn by Audrey Hepburn in the 1963 movie Charade, as part of the Harrods Timeless Luxury promotion.

In 2012, pop singer Lady Gaga wore the dress to meet Donatella Versace in Milan.

== See also ==
- List of individual dresses
