= Green Versace dress of Jennifer Lopez =

Dress worn to the 2000 Grammy Awards

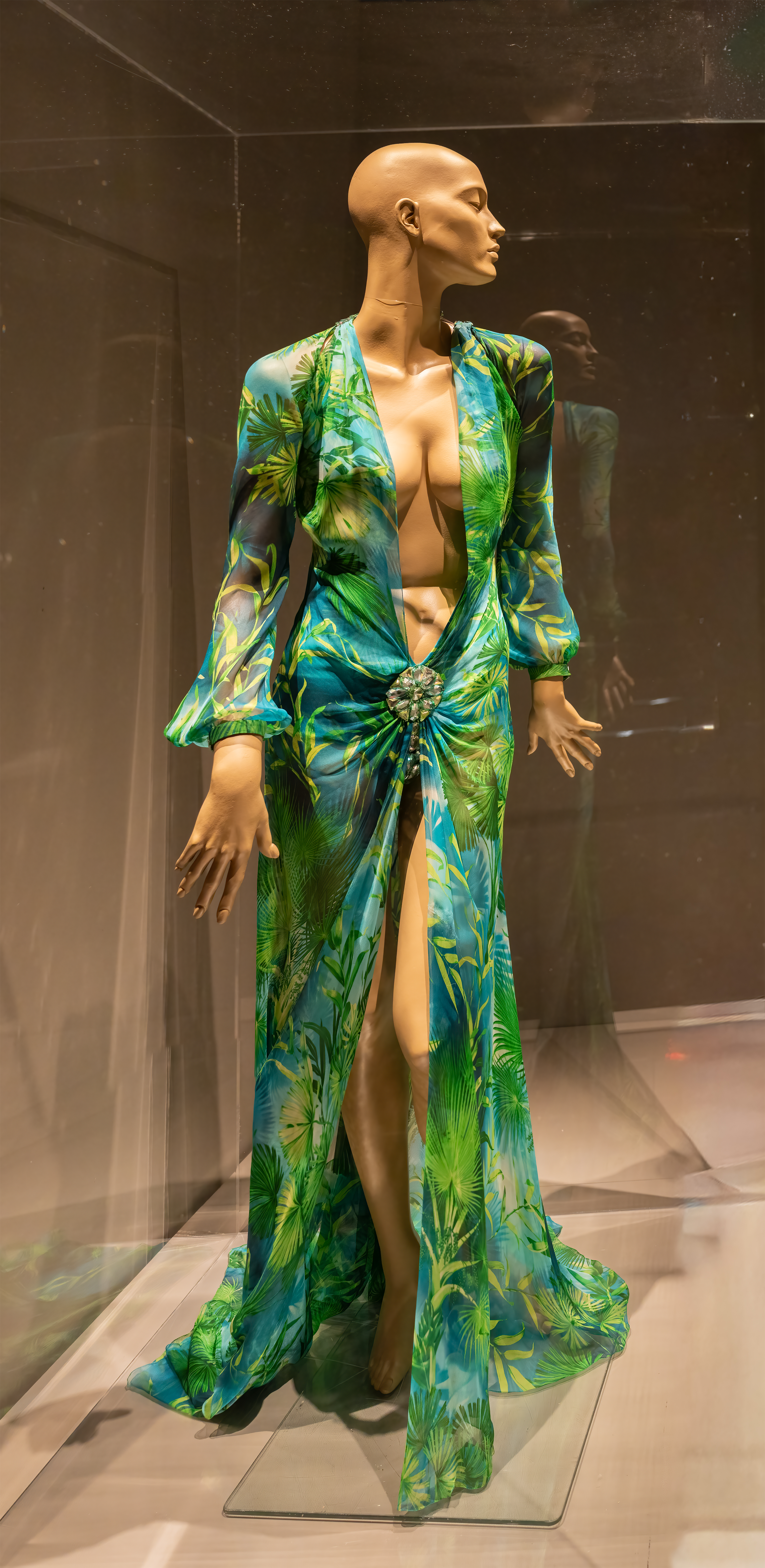
- A replica of the silk chiffon dress worn by Jennifer Lopez to the Grammys in February 2000, exhibited at the Fashion Institute of Technology Museum
- Designer: Donatella Versace
- Year: 2000
- Type: Green dress
- Material: Silk chiffon
- On display at: Lopez's Los Angeles residence (original); The Grammy Museum (duplicate); Fashion Museum, Bath (duplicate)

American entertainer Jennifer Lopez wore a green Versace silk chiffon dress designed by Donatella Versace to the 42nd Grammy Awards ceremony on February 23, 2000. The sheer fabric was printed with a tropical leaf and bamboo pattern, and cut with a plunging neckline that extended well past Lopez's navel, while the waist of the dress was studded with citrines.

This garment instantly received significant global media coverage, and it has been cited, along with Elizabeth Hurley's black Versace dress, as one of the most high-profile dresses that made the designer Versace a household name. In addition, this dress was described as a turning point in designer Donatella Versace's career after the death of her brother, Gianni Versace. It was chosen by fashion journalist Lisa Armstrong to represent 2000 in the Fashion Museum of Bath's Dress of the Year collection, at which point it was described as a key example of the close relationship between fashions, celebrities and publicity.

Another duplicate of the dress is displayed at The Grammy Museum while, as of 2015, Lopez herself still owned the original gown.

== Background ==
Before it became famous on the red carpet of the Grammy Awards, the dress was presented on the catwalk by model Amber Valletta, and was featured in Versace's main advertising campaign that year. Steven Meisel also photographed it on Valletta. Andrea Lieberman, Lopez's stylist at the time, remarked, "Versace and Jennifer [Lopez] belonged together. It was really natural."

In 2000, the dress had a market value of approximately $15,000. Spice Girl Geri Halliwell wore the same dress to the NRJ Music Awards in France in January 2000, approximately one month before Lopez wore it; however, she failed to receive as much attention as Lopez did. The designer herself wore it to a Met Gala on December 6, 1999.

Lopez arrived on the red carpet of the 42nd Grammy Awards in the company of then-boyfriend Sean Combs; he was dressed in a gray suit. The actress-singer immediately monopolized the attention and curiosity of the public and photographers at the event. Actor David Duchovny appeared on stage with Lopez to present the award for Best R&B Album and joked to the audience, "This is the first time in five or six years that I'm sure that nobody is looking at me." In saying this, he elicited laughter from the audience and Lopez.

== Design ==
Designed by Donatella Versace, it has been described as "jungle green", "sea green" or "tropical" green, a green dress with touches of blue to give an exotic appearance. It is a see-through silk chiffon dress with a tropical leaf and bamboo pattern, with a citrine-studded crotch. It is also known as the "Jungle-Dress". The dress "had a low-cut neck that extended several inches below her navel, where it was loosely fastened with a sparkly brooch and then opened out again," exposing her midriff and then cut along the front of the legs like a bath robe. The dress then drooped behind her on the floor, open at the back.

Under it, Lopez wore a pair of nude-tone bathing suit shorts and kept the dress on by using double-sided fashion tape.

== Reception ==
The dress was discussed by those in the fashion and entertainment industries for weeks after the event, with dedicated television specials and magazine covers featuring it. Images of Lopez in the green dress were downloaded from the Grammy website 642,917 times in just 24 hours after the event. The dress has been cited along with the black Versace dress of Elizabeth Hurley as being one of those most iconic dresses which made Versace a household name. Vibe magazine said, "Jen Lo made Donatella Versace's diaphanous green fabric a national call to arms." Others have argued that the dress led to Lopez becoming "one of the most glamorous and publicity-friendly icons of the red carpet."

Lopez was surprised by the enormous media coverage, declaring in an interview: "It was a nice dress. I had no idea it was going to become such a big deal." Donatella Versace later revealed that the dress was the turning point of her career, saying that the media now had confidence in her own work, after the death of Gianni Versace. She declared to the Canadian press, "It was an unexpected success. The next day she [Jennifer Lopez] was everywhere and people were talking about her in that dress. It was one of those moments like the one that Gianni [Versace] had with Elizabeth Hurley and clothes-pins." The dress has been referred to many times as "notorious" and "infamous" because of its boldness.

== Legacy ==
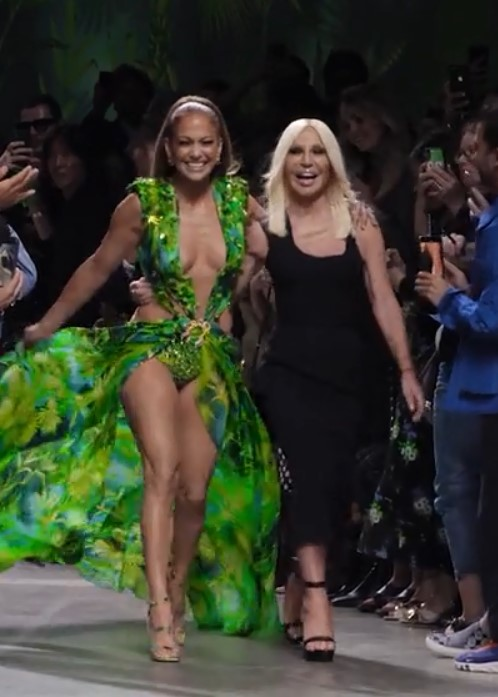
Jennifer Lopez with Donatella Versace in 2019, wearing a similar dress

At the 72nd Academy Awards in March 2000, South Park co-creator Trey Parker wore an imitation of the dress.

The Fashion Museum, Bath, asked Lisa Armstrong of the Times to choose an outfit to represent 2000 for their "Dress of the Year" collection. While Armstrong initially considered choosing Hussein Chalayan's table dress, she eventually decided on the Versace dress, arguing that due to the media attention it had received through being worn by Lopez, Geri Halliwell, and others, the gown represented "some kind of high water mark in the current symbiosis between fashion and celebrity." Versace subsequently donated a duplicate of the dress to the museum. Another duplicate is displayed at the Grammy Museum in Los Angeles. As of 2015, the original dress remains in Lopez's possession.

Lopez wore the dress during her monologue while hosting Saturday Night Live in February 2001. She wore a dress resembling the original during her monologue when she returned to host in December 2019. Lopez modeled a reimagined version of the dress at the Spring 2020 Versace show during Milan Fashion Week in September 2019.

On October 15, 2002, at the Radio City Music Hall in New York City, Lopez was awarded the VH1 Vogue Fashion Award as the most influential star of the year. The award was presented by Versace herself.

In a poll by Debenhams, published in the Daily Telegraph in 2008, the dress was voted the fifth most iconic red carpet dress of all time.

In January 2015, Google's president Eric Schmidt cited the massive attention to this dress as the motivation for the creation of Google Images search in 2001. In 2000, Google Search results were limited to simple pages of text with links, but the developers worked on developing this further, realizing that an image search was required to answer "the most popular search query" they had seen to date: Jennifer Lopez's green dress.

A replica of the dress was worn by Kerri Colby on the runway during an episode of the 14th season of RuPaul's Drag Race in January 2022.

In May 2022, a duplicate of the dress appeared in the season 14 premiere episode of The Real Housewives of Atlanta as a part of cast member Marlo Hampton's fashion archive showroom.

In May 2026, the character Allie Hayes (Mika Abdalla) wore a recreation of the dress in season one of Off Campus, a Prime Video original romance series. The recreation was made from scratch. Lopez expressed approval towards the homage via X.

== See also ==
- List of individual dresses
