= Mayra Rivera =

Puerto Rican religious scholar

Mayra Rivera is a scholar of religion who is the Andrew W. Mellon Professor of Religion and Latinx Studies at Harvard University.

== Biography ==
Rivera was born and raised in Puerto Rico. After first receiving a Bachelor of Science in chemical engineering from the University of Puerto Rico at Mayagüez, Rivera received a PhD (2005) in theological and religious studies from Drew University.

Rivera is known for her academic contributions in the area of postcolonialism, especially with reference to Caribbean thought. Her current work examines the impact of climate change from a Caribbean perspective.

Rivera is a member of the American Academy of Religion, and was elected president for 2022.

== Works ==
- Postcolonial Theologies: Divinity and Empire (edited with Catherine Keller and Michael Nausner, Chalice Press, 2004)
- The Touch of Transcendence (Westminster John Knox Press, 2007)
- Planetary Loves: Spivak, Postcoloniality, and Theology (edited with Stephen D. Moore, Fordham University, 2010)
- Poetics of the Flesh (Duke University, 2015)
