= Aida Hurtado =

Feminist psychologist

Aída Hurtado is a social psychologist, academic and the Luis Leal Endowed Chair in Chicana/o Studies at the University of California, Santa Barbara, known for her interdisciplinary research in social psychology, Chicana/o students and feminist studies.

== Selected publications ==
- Hurtado, A., Cervantez, K., & Eccleston, M. Infinite possibilities, many remaining obstacles: Language, culture, and identity in Latino/a educational achievement. In E. J. Murillo Jr., & E. E. Garcia (Eds.) The handbook of Latinos and education: Theory, research, and practice. New York: Routledge, 2010.
- Hurtado, A. Multiple lenses: Multicultural feminist theory. In H. Landrine & N. Russo (Eds.),Handbook of diversity in feminist psychology. New York: Springer Publishing Company, 2009.
- Hurtado, A., & Cervantez, K. A view from within and from without: The development of Latina feminist psychology. In F. A. Villarruel, G. Carlo, J. Grau, M. Azmitia, N. Cabrera & T. J. Chahin, (Eds.), The Handbook of US Latino Psychology: Developmental and community based perspectives(pp. 171-190). Thousand Oakes, CA: Sage Publications, 2009.
