= Jennifer Lopez filmography =

Filmography

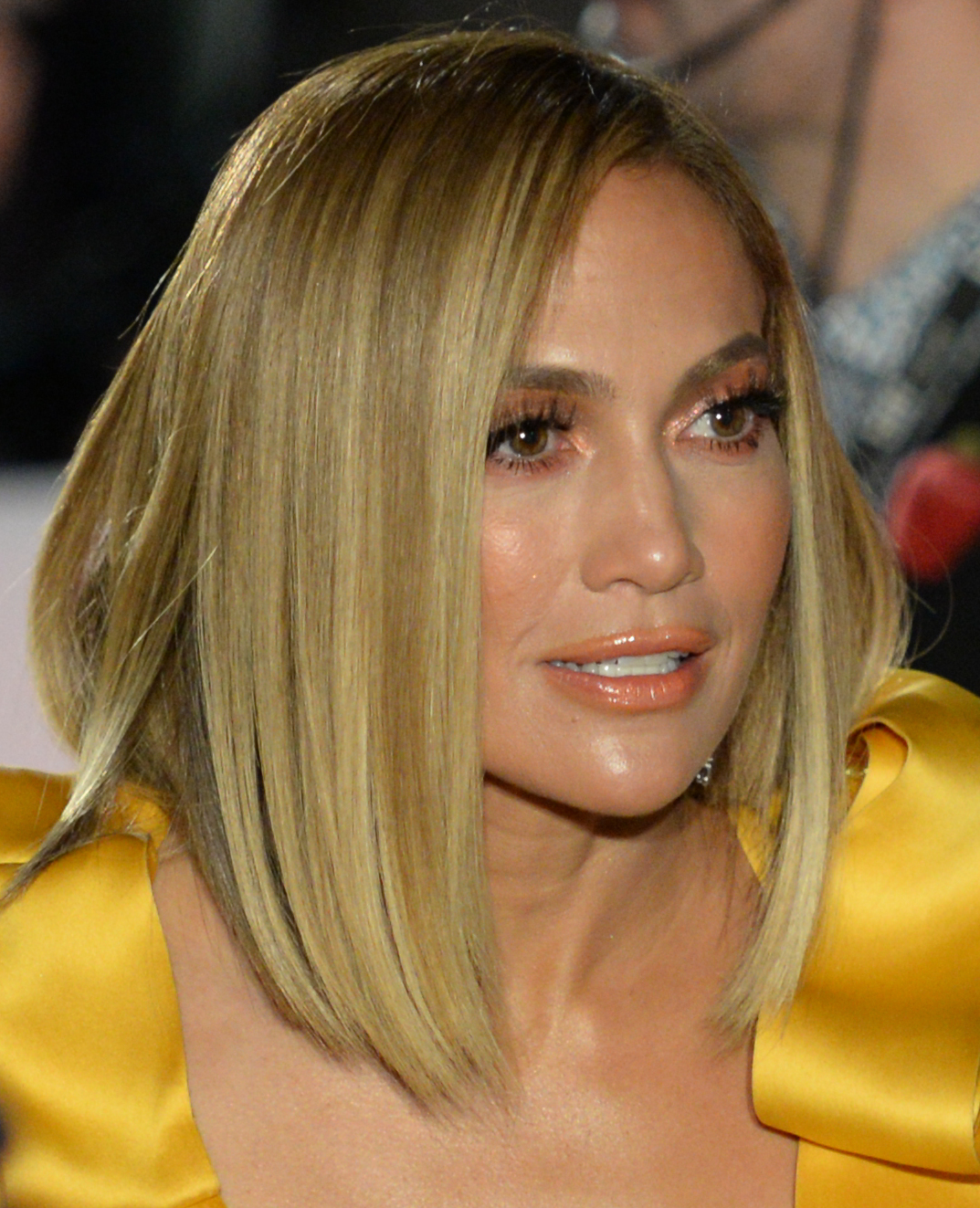
Lopez attending the premiere of Hustlers at the 2019 Toronto International Film Festival.

Jennifer Lopez has starred in over forty feature films during a career that spans four decades as an actor and a producer. She is the highest-paid Latina actress in Hollywood, and was one of the highest-paid actresses during the 2000s, making in the region of $20 million USD per film role. She is also reportedly the richest actress in Hollywood, with an estimated net worth of $400 million.

Lopez's first high-profile job was as a dancer on the sketch comedy series In Living Color (1991–1993). After deciding to pursue an acting career, she appeared in the television film Nurses on the Line: The Crash of Flight 7 (1993) before starring in the short-lived television series Second Chances (1993) and its spin-off, Hotel Malibu (1994). For her theatrical film debut in My Family (1995), Lopez was nominated for the Independent Spirit Award for Best Supporting Female. She began booking larger film roles; she played a police officer in Money Train (1995), a teacher in Francis Ford Coppola's comedy-drama Jack (1996), and starred opposite Jack Nicholson as a "calculating Cuban maid" in Blood and Wine (1997). Lopez rose to wider prominence playing singer Selena Quintanilla in the biopic Selena (1997), which is often cited as her breakout role. Selena was a box office success and earned Lopez a Golden Globe Award nomination. Later that year, she starred in the horror film Anaconda, her first major box office success, and had an "exploitative femme fatale role" in Oliver Stone's neo-noir thriller U Turn. She starred as a U.S. Marshal in Steven Soderbergh's crime film Out of Sight (1998), which drew critical praise and is often cited as her best role. Lopez also lent her voice to the animated film Antz (1998).

During the early 2000s, Lopez established herself as one of the highest-paid actresses in Hollywood. She starred in the psychological thriller The Cell (2000), followed by her first romantic comedy, The Wedding Planner (2001), both of which were box office successes. Her next films, Angel Eyes (2001) and Enough (2002), were not commercially or critically successful, though Enough has received retrospective praise and developed a cult following. Afterwards, she became known for starring in romantic comedies, including the commercially successful Maid in Manhattan (2002), Shall We Dance? (2004), and Monster-in-Law (2005). During this period, she also starred alongside then-boyfriend Ben Affleck in Gigli (2003), often considered one of the worst films of all time, and Jersey Girl (2004). Lopez's subsequent films were "disappointing-to-middling successes". She starred in An Unfinished Life (2005), after which she began producing her own projects with El Cantante (2006) and Bordertown (2007).

After a three-year career hiatus, Lopez starred in the romantic comedy The Back-Up Plan (2010), and later returned to prominence as a judge on American Idol (2011–2016), which made her one of the highest-paid American television stars. In 2012, she launched her own talent show, ¡Q'Viva! The Chosen, and appeared in the ensemble comedy film What to Expect When You're Expecting. She continued to produce various television projects through her company Nuyorican Productions, most notably The Fosters (2013–2018). During this period, she appeared in the thriller films Parker (2013), The Boy Next Door and Lila & Eve (both 2015). She also had voice roles in the animated films Ice Age: Continental Drift (2012), Home (2015) and Ice Age: Collision Course (2016). Lopez produced and starred in the NBC police drama series Shades of Blue (2016–2018). Her next film, the comedy-drama Second Act (2018), was successful at the box office. She received critical praise for playing a stripper in the crime drama Hustlers (2019), winning the Spotlight Award at the Palm Springs International Film Festival and receiving Golden Globe and Screen Actors Guild Award nominations for her performance.

Since the early 2020s, Lopez has established herself as one of the "most prominent leading actresses of the streaming era". She has starred in a string of successful streaming films including Marry Me (2022), Shotgun Wedding (2022), The Mother (2023), This Is Me... Now: A Love Story—her first film as a co-writer―and Atlas (both 2024). She also received critical praise for her supporting roles in the sports biopic Unstoppable (2024) and Bill Condon's musical drama, Kiss of the Spider Woman (2025).

Lopez has various projects in development. She is slated to produce a new animated Bob the Builder movie, and will star in two films for Netflix: the romantic comedy Office Romance, and the Robert Zemeckis-directed psychological thriller The Last Mrs. Parrish.

== Film ==
Year	Title	Role	Notes	Ref.
1993	Nurses on the Line: The Crash of Flight 7	Rosie Romero	Also known as Lost in the Wild	
1995	My Family	Young Maria	Also known as Mi Familia	
1995	Money Train	Grace Santiago		
1996	Jack	Miss Marquez		
1997	Blood and Wine	Gabriella		
1997	Selena	Selena Quintanilla-Pérez		
1997	Anaconda	Terri Flores		
1997	U Turn	Grace McKenna		
1998	Out of Sight	Karen Sisco		
1998	Antz	Azteca	Voice role	
2000	The Cell	Catherine Deane		
2001	The Wedding Planner	Mary Fiore		
2001	Angel Eyes	Sharon Pogue		
2002	Enough	Slim Hiller		
2002	Maid in Manhattan	Marisa Ventura		
2003	Gigli	Ricki		
2004	Jersey Girl	Gertrude Steiney		
2004	Shall We Dance?	Paulina		
2005	Monster-in-Law	Charlotte Cantilini		
2005	An Unfinished Life	Jean Gilkyson		
2006	El Cantante	Puchi	Also producer	
2007	Bordertown	Lauren Adrian	Also producer	
2007	Manufacturing Dissent	Herself	Documentary	
2007	Feel the Noise	Herself	Cameo; also producer	
2010	The Back-up Plan	Zoe		
2012	Sellebrity	Herself	Documentary	
2012	What to Expect When You're Expecting	Holly		
2012	Ice Age: Continental Drift	Shira	Voice role	
2013	Parker	Leslie Rodgers		
2014	Jennifer Lopez: Dance Again	Herself	Documentary; also executive producer	
2015	The Boy Next Door	Claire Peterson	Also producer	
2015	Lila & Eve	Eve Rafael		
2015	Home	Lucy Tucci	Voice role	
2015	The Latin Explosion: A New America	Herself	Documentary	
2016	Ice Age: Collision Course	Shira	Voice role	
2017	Welcome to My Life	Herself	Documentary	
2018	Second Act	Maya DaVilla / Maria Vargas	Also producer	
2019	Hustlers	Ramona Vega	Also producer	
2019	Wonder Boy	Herself	Documentary	
2022	Marry Me	Katalina "Kat" Valdez	Also producer	
2022	Jennifer Lopez: Halftime	Herself	Documentary	
2022	Shotgun Wedding	Darcy	Also producer	
2023	The Mother	The Mother	Also producer	
2024	This Is Me... Now: A Love Story	The Artist	Also co-writer and executive producer	
2024	The Greatest Love Story Never Told	Herself	Documentary	
2024	Atlas	Atlas Shepherd	Also producer	
2024	Unstoppable	Judy Robles		
2025	Kiss of the Spider Woman	Ingrid Luna / Aurora / The Spider Woman	Also executive producer	
2025	Anaconda	Herself	Uncredited cameo	
2026	Office Romance	Jackie Cruz	Also producer	
TBA	The Last Mrs. Parrish †	Daphne Parrish	Post-production; also producer	

Key
†	Denotes films that have not yet been released

== Television ==
Year	Title	Role	Notes	Ref.
1991–1993	In Living Color	Fly Girl	62 episodes	
1993–1994	Second Chances	Melinda Lopez	4 episodes	
1994	Hotel Malibu	Melinda Lopez	6 episodes	
1994	South Central	Lucille	4 episodes	
2000–2019	Saturday Night Live	Herself (host/musical guest)	4 episodes	
2004–2018	Will & Grace	Herself	4 episodes	
2006	South Beach	—N/a	8 episodes; executive producer only	
2007	DanceLife	—N/a	8 episodes; executive producer and co-creator only	
2007	Jennifer Lopez Presents: Como Ama una Mujer	—N/a	5 episodes; executive producer and creator only	
2010	How I Met Your Mother	Anita Appleby	Episode: "Of Course"	
2011–2012; 2014–2016; 2021	American Idol	Herself (judge)	170 episodes	
2011–2014	South Beach Tow	—N/a	87 episodes; executive producer only	
2012	Q'Viva! The Chosen	Herself	12 episodes; also executive producer	
2013–2018	The Fosters	—N/a	104 episodes; executive producer only	
2015; 2025	43rd Annual American Music Awards	Herself (host)	Television special	
2016–2018	Shades of Blue	Harlee Santos	36 episodes; also executive producer	
2017–2020	World of Dance	Herself (judge)	Also executive producer	
2017	One Voice Somos Live: A Concert for Disaster Relief	Herself	Television special	
2019–2024	Good Trouble	—N/a	Executive producer only	
2020	One World: Together at Home	Herself	Television special	
2020	Dear Class of 2020	Herself	Web television special	
2022	RuPaul's Drag Race	Herself	Guest appearance	

== Video games ==
Year	Title	Voice role	Ref.
2012	Ice Age: Continental Drift – Arctic Games	Shira	
