= Michael Joseph Gross =

American journalist

Michael Joseph Gross (born 1970) is an American author and journalist.

He is a contributing editor to Vanity Fair, where he covers topics including politics, technology, and national security. He has also written extensively for publications such as Blender, The New York Times, The Boston Globe, and GQ. Gross is the author of the book Starstruck: When a Fan Gets Close to Fame, published in 2006 by Bloomsbury Publishing.

Gross attended Williams College, and later studied at Princeton Theological Seminary. After graduating, he wrote speeches for Massachusetts Governor William Weld, a Republican.

== Publications ==
- Stronger: the untold story of muscle in our lives. 2025. ISBN 9781399633321.
