= Frances Negrón-Muntaner =

Puerto Rican filmmaker (born 1966)

- Born: 1966 (age 59–60); Santurce, Puerto Rico
- Education: Rutgers University (PhD)
- Occupations: filmmaker, writer, scholar
- Writing career
- Notable work: Brincando el charco: Portrait of a Puerto Rican

Frances Negrón-Muntaner (born 1966) is a Puerto Rican filmmaker, writer, and scholar. Her work is focused on a comparative exploration of coloniality, primarily in Puerto Rico and the United States, with special attention given to the intersections between race, ethnicity, gender, sexuality, and politics. She is an associate professor of English and Comparative Literature and Director of the Center for the Study of Ethnicity and Race at Columbia University in New York City. She has also contributed to the Huffington Post, El Diario/La Prensa, and 80 Grados, and since 2008 has served as a Global Expert for the United Nations Rapid Response Media Mechanism. She is one of the best-known Puerto Rican lesbian artists currently living in the United States.

== Life and education ==
Negrón-Muntaner was born in Santurce, Puerto Rico. She comes from a family of academics: both of her parents were professors at the University of Puerto Rico, Río Piedras. Her grandfather encouraged her to study film when she was a child. She obtained a Bachelor's in sociology at the University of Puerto Rico (1986), a Master in Visual Anthropology and a Master of Fine Arts in Film and Video at Temple University, Philadelphia (1991, 1994), and a Ph.D. in Comparative Literature from Rutgers University, New Brunswick (2000). In addition to her teaching excellence, Frances Negron-Muntaner has been lauded for her research contributions, receiving the prestigious Lenfest Award from Columbia University in 2012. Beyond her classroom, she has held leadership positions at the university, serving as a professor and Director of the Center for the Study of Ethnicity and Race from 2009 to 2016.

== Films ==
Since the late 1980s, Negrón-Muntaner has been exploring issues of sexuality, colonialism, nationalism, and migration in Puerto Rican/Latino diasporic communities. In 1989, with Peter Biella she co-directed AIDS in the Barrio: Eso no me pasa a mí, an educational documentary about the situation of the Puerto Rican community in Philadelphia and their responses to the HIV/AIDS crisis. In 1994, she released the award-winning Brincando el charco: Portrait of a Puerto Rican (1995 Whitney Biennial, Audience Award at the 1995 San Juan CinemaFest and a Merit Selection at the 1995 Latin American Studies Association Film Festival), the first Puerto Rican film to examine issues of race, gender and homophobia in the context of migration. This documentary/fiction film is based on Negrón-Muntaner's experiences as a diasporic Puerto Rican lesbian artist and activist in Philadelphia and took five years to make.

== Scholarship ==
Negrón-Muntaner is a prolific, interdisciplinary cultural critic whose scholarship has made significant contributions to Latino Studies and Caribbean Studies among other fields. In 1997, she co-edited with Ramón Grosfoguel the anthology Puerto Rican Jam: Rethinking Colonialism and Nationalism. In 2004, Negrón-Muntaner published Boricua Pop: Puerto Ricans and the Latinization of American Culture (CHOICE Award 2004), a collection of essays that included "Jennifer's Butt!, a landmark text for the discussion of contemporary U.S. popular culture. In this essay, the author focuses on media representations of Jennifer Lopez. The book also has chapters on West Side Story, Ricky Martin, and Holly Woodlawn, with interesting insights about Puerto Rican homosexuality in the United States. Negrón-Muntaner has also edited several additional books, including None of the Above: Puerto Ricans in the Global Era (Palgrave 2007) and Sovereign Acts (South End Press, 2009).

== Political activism ==
In 1997, Negrón-Muntaner wrote the first draft of what was to become "The Radical Statehood Manifesto", a political intervention that sought to challenge conventional ideas of sovereignty in the Caribbean.

== Media advocacy ==
Negrón-Muntaner has also contributed to the founding of programs and institutions to disseminate the work of Latino filmmakers and intellectuals. She is the founder of Miami Light Project's Filmmakers Workshop, the organizer/fundraiser of several conferences on Puerto Rican/Latino affairs, and a founding board member and former chair of NALIP, the National Association of Latino Independent Producers.

During her three-year tenure as NALIP's board chair, Negrón-Muntaner actively participated in the creation of the organization's signature programs (the annual conference, Latino Producers Academy, and Latino Writers Lab). She has also been part of the leadership responsible for the organization's transformation from a startup operation with a few hundred members in 1999 into the country's most important Latino producer organization, with over a thousand members and a $1 million budget.

== Awards ==
For her work as a scholar and filmmaker, Negrón-Muntaner has received Ford, Truman, Scripps Howard, Rockefeller, and 1994 Pew Fellowships in the Arts. Major foundations and public television funding sources have also supported her work. For her work as a filmmaker, advocate, and scholar, she was named as one of the nation's "100 Most influential Latinos" by Hispanic Business magazine in 2005.

== See also ==
- LGBT literature
- LGBT rights in Puerto Rico
- List of Puerto Ricans
- List of gay, lesbian or bisexual people
- List of LGBT writers
- List of Puerto Rican writers
- Puerto Rican literature
- Puerto Ricans in the United States
- Queer studies
