= Ralph Pucci =

American mannequin designer and entrepreneur (born 1954)

- Born: 1954 (age 71–72); New York State, United States
- Occupations: Designer, gallery owner and entrepreneur
- Known for: Designing mannequins

Ralph Pucci (born 1954) is an American mannequin designer, gallery owner and entrepreneur.

== Career ==
The family business began with Nick and Lee Pucci in 1954 repairing mannequins in their Mount Vernon, NY basement. Ralph Pucci joined the company in 1976 at the age of 22 and began to fabricate unique mannequins, which went onto great acclaim.

One of Pucci's innovations in the field of mannequin design was to collaborate with other artists and designers, such as Kenny Scharf, Ruben Toledo, Andrée Putman and Maira Kalman. He also created mannequins based on legends like Christy Turlington and Veruschka. In 2004, Pucci released a line of larger-sized female mannequins.

After he collaborated with the French designer Andrée Putman, Pucci began to sell some of her furniture designs as well, and began to represent top European furniture designers. His furniture business eventually eclipsed his mannequin business in volume. Due to the waning retail world during the COVID pandemic, RALPH PUCCI International was able to maintain its sculpting and manufacturing capabilities in the heart of Manhattan by pivoting the skills of the factory to produce in-house furniture and lighting designs in a material called Plasterglass.

In March 2015, a retrospective of Pucci's mannequins were shown in an exhibition at the Museum of Arts and Design.

== Ralph Pucci International ==
Ralph Pucci International is a luxury furniture, lighting and art gallery headquartered in New York City. What began as a family business in the 1950s fabricating mannequins has grown to a gallery and showroom, with outposts in Miami and Los Angeles and a pop-up in London's Mayfair neighborhood that ran from 2022-2023.

Today, RALPH PUCCI International collaborates with the world's leading artists and designers and is particularly drawn to pieces that highlight the "hand of the artist." Now in its third generation, with siblings Michael and Nicole Pucci steering the business towards its seventh generation, the company continues to pioneer both collectible editions by artists like Herve Van Der Straeten, Xavier Lust and Stefan Bishop, and in-house collections, pivoting the manufacturing skills of the mannequin craftsmen into new designs made in the Manhattan headquarters on 18th Street. These include creations with Elizabeth Garouste, John Koga, Patrick Naggar, Eric Schmitt, Paul Mathieu and Lee Mindel.

== Recognition and philanthropy ==
In 2009, Ralph Pucci was the recipient of DDI’s Markopoulos Award, the highest distinction in the visual merchandising industry.

In 2015, New York’s Museum of Art and Design presented an exhibition called “Ralph Pucci: The Art of the Mannequin” which then traveled to Northeastern University in Boston 2016.

In 2016, the Museum of the City of New York presented Ralph Pucci with its City of Design Award which recognizes it says “those who have made New York the design capital of the world and inspire future generations of designers.”

In 2025, Chateau La Coste, a premier art foundation, held a major exhibition titled: Ralph Pucci 'Pure': a Celebration of a Sculpture Studio. The summer exhibition was held in Oscar Niemeyer's last building and featured the company's proprietary material called plasterglass. The show featured designs by 14 different artists with whom the company collaborates.

Pucci was the recipient of the Creative Innovation Award from Inner-City Arts in Los Angeles in 2013, and, in 2014, honored by the Kips Bay Boys & Girls Club.

In 2026, Pucci received the rank of Chevalier of the Ordre des Arts et des Lettres, for contributions to art and design presented by Mohamed Bouabdallah, Cultural Counselor of France in the United States.

Other accolades include “The Best in Furniture and Furnishings,” by Robb Report, “The Best Showroom” by Wallpaper, and a “Best of the Year in Interiors, Architecture, Fashion and Design” according to Interior Design. In 2023, Pucci was named a Trailblazer in the Wallpaper* Guide to Creative America.

There are two books about the history of Pucci and the variety of exhibitions staged over the years: Show and Wall.

Since 2016, RALPH PUCCI has collaborated with Jazz House Kids, a musical education nonprofit based in New Jersey. The RALPH PUCCI JAZZ SET is an annual benefit concert hosted in the Manhattan flagship gallery with celebrated bassist Christian McBride, which has raised over $2 million to date, with performances by: John Pizzarelli (Dec 2016); Esperanza Spalding (Dec 2017); Laurie Anderson (Jan 2019); Diana Krall (Jan 2020); Wynton Marsalis (March 2021); Norah Jones (Feb 2022); Gregory Porter (Feb 2023); Sting (Feb 2024); Angelique Kidjo (Feb 2025); Samara Joy (Feb 2026). The one-night event with Sting raised over $810,000 to benefit Jazz House Kids. In total, they have raised over $3,200,000.00.
