= List of awards and nominations received by Jennifer Lopez =

Jennifer Lopez awards and nominations
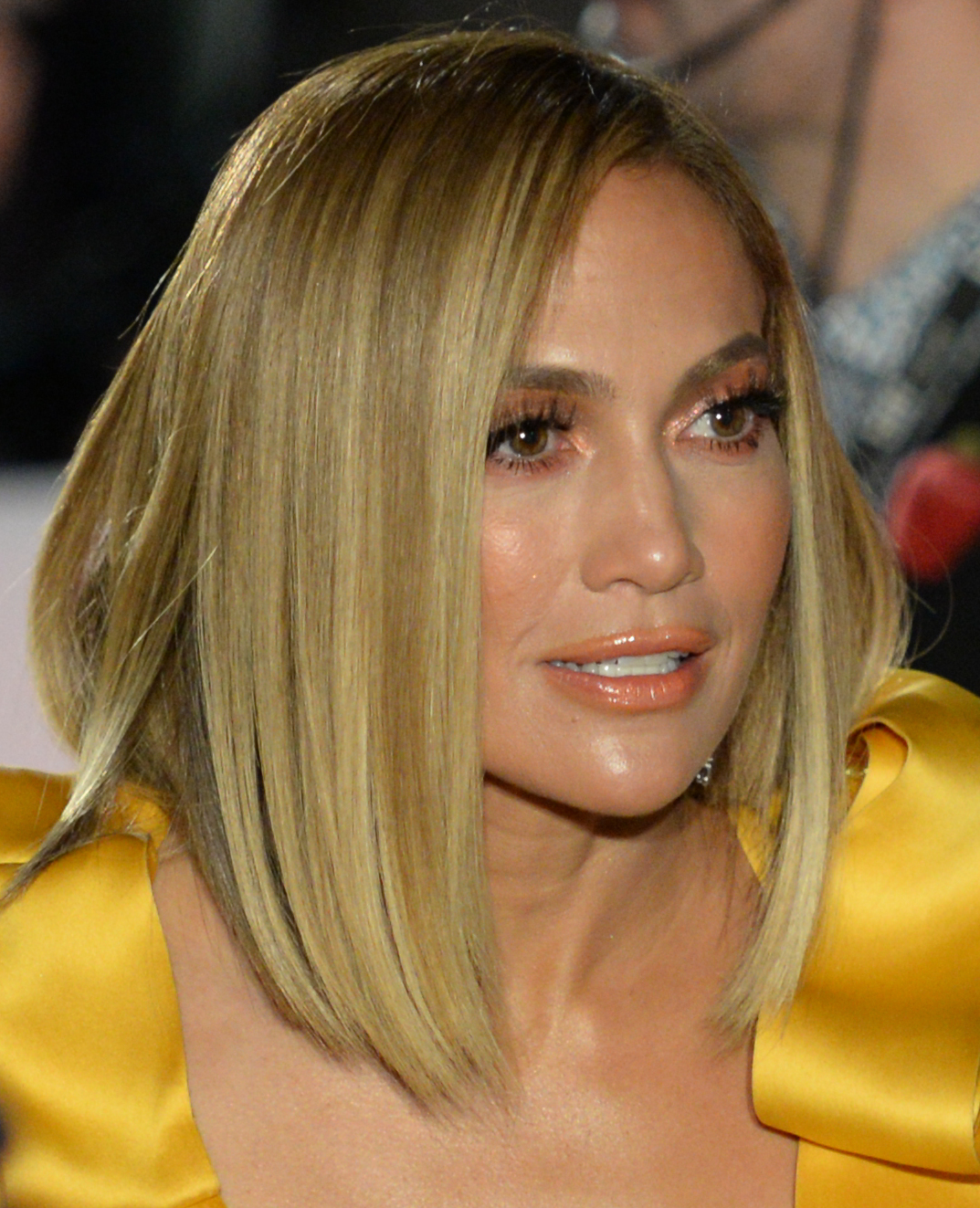
- Lopez at the Toronto International Film Festival in 2019
Awards and nominations
Award	Wins	Nominations
Grammy Awards	0	2
Golden Globe Awards	0	2
Latin Grammy Awards	0	2
Primetime Emmy Awards	0	1
Screen Actors Guild Awards	0	1

Totals (Note: Certain award groups do not simply award one winner. They acknowledge several different recipients, have runners-up, and have third place. Since this is a specific recognition and is different from losing an award, runner-up mentions are considered wins in this award tally. For simplification and to avoid errors, each award in this list has been presumed to have had a prior nomination.)
- Wins: 189
- Nominations: 580

Jennifer Lopez is an American singer and actress. After gaining her first regular high-profile job as a Fly Girl dancer on In Living Color in 1991, she decided to pursue an acting career in 1993. For her performance in the independent drama film My Family (1995), Lopez was nominated for the Independent Spirit Award for Best Supporting Female. Her breakthrough role came when she starred in Selena (1997), which earned her a Golden Globe Award nomination for Best Actress – Motion Picture Comedy or Musical. With Selena, Lopez also became the first Latin actress to earn over US$1 million for a film role. For her subsequent role in Out of Sight (1998), she was nominated for the Empire Award for Best Actress.

Lopez's debut album On the 6 (1999) garnered her various awards and nominations. Its singles "Waiting for Tonight" and "Let's Get Loud" both received Grammy Award nominations for Best Dance Recording, with the former also winning the MTV Video Music Award for Best Dance Video. In 2001, she won an MTV Europe Music Award for Best Female, and the following year, "I'm Real" from her second studio album J.Lo (2001) won the MTV Video Music Award for Best Hip-Hop Video. Lopez's next album J to tha L–O! The Remixes (2002) was recognized by Guinness World Records as the first remix album to reach number one on the U.S. Billboard 200. In 2006, Lopez was presented with the Crystal Award by Women in Film for her "strong portrayals of women" and charitable work.

Lopez was honored by the World Music Awards with the Legend Award for her contribution to the arts in 2010. The music video for "On the Floor" was recognized as the "Highest Viewed Female Music Video of All Time" by Guinness World Records in 2012. In 2013, she was presented with the landmark 2,500th star on the Hollywood Walk of Fame for her musical contributions, and the World Icon Award at the 2013 Premios Juventud. In 2014, she became the first female recipient of the Billboard Icon Award. She was awarded the Telemundo Star Award at the Billboard Latin Music Awards in 2017. In 2018, she became the first Latin artist to receive the Michael Jackson Video Vanguard Award. Her performance in the crime drama Hustlers (2019) earned her nominations for the Golden Globe Award for Best Supporting Actress – Motion Picture and the Screen Actors Guild Award for Outstanding Performance by a Female Actor in a Supporting Role. She received a Primetime Emmy Award nomination in 2020 as a headlining performer at the Super Bowl LIV halftime show.

Lopez ranked at number one on "100 Most Influential Hispanics" by People en Español in 2007, and in 2012 topped the Forbes Celebrity 100 list. For her contributions to fashion, the Council of Fashion Designers of America honored Lopez with the Fashion Icon Award in 2019. Outside of entertainment and fashion, Lopez has been honored by organizations such as Amnesty International and the Human Rights Campaign for her humanitarian activities, and received the GLAAD Vanguard Award in 2014.

== Major associations ==
=== Emmy Awards ===
Year	Category	Nominee / work	Result	Ref.
Primetime Emmy Awards
2020	Outstanding Variety Special (Live)	Super Bowl LIV Halftime Show Starring Jennifer Lopez and Shakira	Nominated	

=== Golden Globe Awards ===
Year	Category	Nominee / work	Result	Ref.
1998	Best Actress – Motion Picture Musical or Comedy	Selena	Nominated	
2020	Best Supporting Actress – Motion Picture	Hustlers	Nominated	

=== Grammy Awards ===
Year	Category	Nominee / work	Result	Ref.
2000	Best Dance Recording	"Waiting for Tonight"	Nominated	
2001	Best Dance Recording	"Let's Get Loud"	Nominated	

=== Latin Grammy Awards ===
Year	Category	Nominee / work	Result	Ref.
2000	Best Pop Performance by a Duo/Group with Vocals	"No Me Ames"	Nominated	
2000	Best Music Video	"No Me Ames"	Nominated	

=== Screen Actors Guild Awards ===
Year	Category	Nominee / work	Result	Ref.
2020	Outstanding Performance by a Female Actor in a Supporting Role	Hustlers	Nominated	

== Miscellaneous awards ==
Award / Association	Year (Note: Indicates the year of ceremony. Each year is linked to the article about the awards held that year, wherever possible.)	Nominee / work	Category	Result	Ref.
4Music Video Honours	2011	"On the Floor"	Best Video	Nominated	
4Music Video Honours	2011	"I'm Into You"	Best Video	Nominated	
4Music Video Honours	2012	"Dance Again"	Best Video	Nominated	
4Music Video Honours	2012	"Goin' In"	Best Video	Nominated	
AARP Movies for Grownups Awards	2020	Hustlers	Best Supporting Actress	Nominated	
ACE Awards	2006	Jennifer Lopez	Fashion Icon of the Year	Won	
Alliance of Women Film Journalists EDA Awards	2020	Hustlers	Best Actress in a Supporting Role	Nominated	
Alliance of Women Film Journalists EDA Awards	2020	Hustlers	Most Daring Performance Award	Nominated	
ALMA Awards	1995	Money Train	Outstanding Actress in a Feature Film	Won	
ALMA Awards	1996	Jack	Outstanding Actress in a Feature Film	Nominated	
ALMA Awards	1998	Selena and Anaconda	Outstanding Actress in a Feature Film	Won	
ALMA Awards	1999	Out of Sight	Outstanding Actress in a Feature Film	Won	
ALMA Awards	2000	Jennifer Lopez	Outstanding Music Video Performer	Won	
ALMA Awards	2000	Jennifer Lopez	Entertainer of the Year	Won	
ALMA Awards	2001	Jennifer Lopez	Entertainer of the Year	Won	
ALMA Awards	2001	1st Annual Latin Grammy Awards	Outstanding Host of a Variety or Awards Special	Nominated	
ALMA Awards	2002	Angel Eyes	Outstanding Actress in a Feature Film	Nominated	
ALMA Awards	2002	Jennifer Lopez: Let's Get Loud	Outstanding Performance in a Music, Variety or Comedy Special	Nominated	
ALMA Awards	2002	J.Lo	Album of the Year	Nominated	
ALMA Awards	2002	"Love Don't Cost a Thing"	People's Choice for Outstanding Music Video	Won	
ALMA Awards	2002	Jennifer Lopez	Outstanding Female Performer	Nominated	
ALMA Awards	2006	Jennifer Lopez	Female Music Artist	Nominated	
ALMA Awards	2007	El Cantante	Outstanding Actress in a Feature Film	Nominated	
ALMA Awards	2008	El Cantante	Performance of a Lead Latino/Latina Cast in a Motion Picture	Nominated	
ALMA Awards	2011	American Idol	Favorite Reality, Variety or Comedy Personality Act	Nominated	
ALMA Awards	2011	Jennifer Lopez	Favorite Female Music Artist	Nominated	
ALMA Awards	2012	What to Expect When You're Expecting	Favorite Movie Actress – Comedy or Musical	Nominated	
ALMA Awards	2012	American Idol	Favorite Reality, Variety or Comedy Personality Act	Nominated	
ALMA Awards	2012	Jennifer Lopez	Favorite Female Music Artist	Nominated	
American Music Awards	2000	Jennifer Lopez	Favorite Pop/Rock New Artist	Nominated	
American Music Awards	2000	Jennifer Lopez	Favorite Latin Artist	Nominated	
American Music Awards	2002	Jennifer Lopez	Hip-Hop/R&B Female Artist	Nominated	
American Music Awards	2003	Jennifer Lopez	Hip-Hop/R&B Female Artist	Nominated	
American Music Awards	2003	Jennifer Lopez	Favorite Pop/Rock Female Artist	Won	
American Music Awards	2007	Jennifer Lopez	Favorite Latin Artist	Won	
American Music Awards	2011	Jennifer Lopez	Favorite Latin Artist	Won	
American Telemedicine Association Award	2013	Lopez Family Foundation	ATA Humanitarian Award	Won	
amfAR Award	2013	Jennifer Lopez	Humanitarian Award	Won	
Amnesty International Awards	2007	Bordertown	Artist for Amnesty International (Note: Awards and nominations Lopez has received as a producer.)	Won	
Apollo Theater Spring Benefit Concert & Awards	2010	Jennifer Lopez and Marc Anthony	Arts and Humanitarian Award	Won	
ARIA Music Awards	2011	Jennifer Lopez	Most Popular International Artist	Nominated	
Austin Film Critics Association Awards	2020	Hustlers	Best Supporting Actress	Won	
Bambi Awards	2000	Jennifer Lopez	Best International Pop Performance	Won	
Basenotes Fragrance Awards	2007	Glow by JLo	Best Celebrity Fragrance for Women	Nominated	
Basenotes Fragrance Awards	2007	Live Jennifer Lopez	Best Celebrity Fragrance for Women	Nominated	
Basenotes Fragrance Awards	2008	Glow by JLo	Best Celebrity Women's Fragrance	Nominated	
Basenotes Fragrance Awards	2009	Deseo	Best Celebrity Fragrance for Women	Nominated	
Basenotes Fragrance Awards	2009	Glow by JLo	Best Celebrity Fragrance for Women	Nominated	
Basenotes Fragrance Awards	2009	Deseo for Men	Best Celebrity Fragrance for Men	Nominated	
Best of Las Vegas Awards	2016	Jennifer Lopez: All I Have	Best Production Show	Gold	
Best of Las Vegas Awards	2016	Jennifer Lopez: All I Have	Best Resident Performer	Silver	
Best of Las Vegas Awards	2017	Jennifer Lopez: All I Have	Best Bachelor Party	Bronze	
Beauty Awards	2021	JLo Beauty	Best Eye Cream	Won	
Billboard Music Video Awards	1999	"If You Had My Love"	Maximum Vision Award	Won	
Billboard Music Video Awards	1999	"If You Had My Love"	Best Video	Nominated	
Billboard Music Video Awards	1999	"If You Had My Love"	Best New-Artist Video	Won	
Billboard Music Video Awards	1999	"If You Had My Love"	Best Pop-Clip	Won	
Billboard Music Video Awards	1999	"Waiting for Tonight"	Best Video	Nominated	
Billboard Music Video Awards	1999	"Waiting for Tonight"	Best New-Artist Video	Nominated	
Billboard Music Video Awards	1999	Jennifer Lopez	Best New Artist	Won	
Billboard Music Awards	1999	Jennifer Lopez	Top New Artist	Nominated	
Billboard Music Awards	2001	Jennifer Lopez	Artist of the Year	Nominated	
Billboard Music Awards	2001	Jennifer Lopez	Female Artist of the Year	Nominated	
Billboard Music Awards	2001	Jennifer Lopez	Hot 100 Singles Artist of the Year	Nominated	
Billboard Music Awards	2001	Jennifer Lopez	Female Hot 100 Singles Artist of the Year	Nominated	
Billboard Music Awards	2002	Jennifer Lopez	Female Artist of the Year	Nominated	
Billboard Music Awards	2014	Jennifer Lopez	Icon Award	Won	
Billboard Latin Music Awards	2000	"No Me Ames"	Hot Latin Track of the Year	Nominated	
Billboard Latin Music Awards	2000	"No Me Ames"	Best Vocal Duo	Won	
Billboard Latin Music Awards	2000	"No Me Ames"	Tropical/Salsa Track of the Year	Nominated	
Billboard Latin Music Awards	2002	"Play"	Latin Dance Club Play Track of the Year	Nominated	
Billboard Latin Music Awards	2002	"Amor Se Paga Con Amor"	Latin Dance Maxi-Single of the Year	Won	
Billboard Latin Music Awards	2002	"I'm Real"	Latin Dance Maxi-Single of the Year	Nominated	
Billboard Latin Music Awards	2003	"Alive (Thunderpuss Club Mix)"	Best-Selling Latin Dance Single of the Year	Won	
Billboard Latin Music Awards	2004	"I'm Glad (Paul Oakenfold Remix)"	Best-Selling Latin Dance Single of the Year	Won	
Billboard Latin Music Awards	2008	Como Ama una Mujer	Latin Album of the Year	Nominated	
Billboard Latin Music Awards	2008	Como Ama una Mujer	Latin Pop Album Of The Year, Female	Won	
Billboard Latin Music Awards	2008	"Qué Hiciste"	Latin Pop Airplay Song of the Year	Nominated	
Billboard Latin Music Awards	2008	"Qué Hiciste"	Female Latin Dance Club Play Track of the Year	Nominated	
Billboard Latin Music Awards	2012	"Ven a Bailar"	Vocal Event Song of the Year	Nominated	
Billboard Latin Music Awards	2012	"Ven a Bailar"	Latin Pop Song of the Year	Nominated	
Billboard Latin Music Awards	2012	Jennifer Lopez	Female Songs Artist of the Year	Nominated	
Billboard Latin Music Awards	2013	Enrique Iglesias & Jennifer Lopez Tour	Tour of the Year	Won	
Billboard Latin Music Awards	2013	Jennifer Lopez	Songs Artist of the Year, Female	Nominated	
Billboard Latin Music Awards	2013	"Follow the Leader" (featuring Wisin & Yandel)	Streaming Song of the Year	Nominated	
Billboard Latin Music Awards	2015	"Adrenalina" (with Wisin and Ricky Martin)	Latin Rhythm Airplay Song of the Year	Nominated	
Billboard Latin Music Awards	2016	Jennifer Lopez	Hot Latin Songs Artist of the Year, Female	Nominated	
Billboard Latin Music Awards	2017	Jennifer Lopez	Hot Latin Songs Artist of the Year, Female	Nominated	
Billboard Latin Music Awards	2017	Jennifer Lopez	Social Artist of the Year	Won	
Billboard Latin Music Awards	2017	Jennifer Lopez	Telemundo Star Award	Won	
Billboard Latin Music Awards	2018	Jennifer Lopez	Social Artist of the Year	Nominated	
Billboard Latin Music Awards	2018	Jennifer Lopez	Hot Latin Songs Artist of the Year, Female	Nominated	
Billboard Latin Music Awards	2019	Jennifer Lopez	Hot Latin Songs Artist of the Year, Female	Nominated	
Billboard Latin Music Awards	2019	Jennifer Lopez: All I Have	Tour of the Year	Nominated	
Billboard Latin Music Awards	2020	It's My Party	Tour of the Year	Won	
Billboard.com Mid-Year Music Awards	2011	Jennifer Lopez	Best Comeback	Won	
Billboard.com Mid-Year Music Awards	2011	Jennifer Lopez	Comeback of the Year	Won	
Billboard.com Mid-Year Music Awards	2012	Jennifer Lopez	Sexiest Woman in Music	Nominated	
Billboard.com Mid-Year Music Awards	2014	Jennifer Lopez	Best Comeback	Runner-up	
Billboard Women in Music	2020	Jennifer Lopez	Icon Award	Won	
Blockbuster Entertainment Awards	1998	Anaconda	Favorite Actress – Action & Adventure	Nominated	
Blockbuster Entertainment Awards	2000	On the 6	Favorite Female – New Artist	Nominated	
Blockbuster Entertainment Awards	2001	The Cell	Favorite Actress – Science Fiction	Won	
BMI Awards	2004	"Jenny from the Block"	Award-Winning Song	Won	
BMI Awards	2004	"All I Have"	Award-Winning Song	Won	
BMI Latin Awards	2016	"Adrenalina"	Award-Winning Song	Won	
Boys & Girls Club of America	2000	Jennifer Lopez	Alumni Hall of Fame Award	Inducted	
Brand Genius Awards	2021	Jennifer Lopez	Brand Visionary Award	Recipient	
Bravo Otto	2000	Jennifer Lopez	Female Actress	Silver	
Bravo Otto	2000	Jennifer Lopez	Female Singer	Bronze	
Bravo Otto	2001	Jennifer Lopez	Female Actress	Silver	
Bravo Otto	2002	Jennifer Lopez	Female Actress	Gold	
Break the Internet Awards	2019	Jennifer Lopez	Fashion Moment of the Year	Nominated	
Brit Awards	2000	Jennifer Lopez	Best International Female Artist	Nominated	
Brit Awards	2000	Jennifer Lopez	Best International Breakthrough	Nominated	
Brit Awards	2000	Jennifer Lopez	Best International Newcomer	Nominated	
British LGBT Awards	2021	Jennifer Lopez	Celebrity Ally	Nominated	
Celebrity Fight Night Awards (Note: The Muhammad Ali Celebrity Fight Night Awards were established to honor individuals in the sport, entertainment and business communities for their humanitarian work.)	2013	Jennifer Lopez	Muhammad Ali's Celebrity Fight Night Award	Recipient	
CFDA Fashion Awards	2019	Jennifer Lopez	Fashion Icon Award	Won	
Chicago Film Critics Association Awards	2019	Hustlers	Best Supporting Actress	Nominated	
Chicago Indie Critics Awards	2020	Hustlers	Best Supporting Actress	Nominated	
Children's Hospital Los Angeles Award	2004	Jennifer Lopez	Children's Humanitarian Award	Won	
City of Miami Beach	2019	Jennifer Lopez	Keys to the City	Recipient	
Critics' Choice Movie Awards	2020	Hustlers	Best Supporting Actress	Nominated	
Dallas–Fort Worth Film Critics Association Awards	2019	Hustlers	Best Supporting Actress	4th place	
DanceStar Awards	2002	Jennifer Lopez	Best Chart Artist	Won	
DanceStar Awards	2003	Jennifer Lopez	Best Chart Artist	Nominated	
DanceStar Awards	2003	"Alive (Thunderpuss remix)"	Party 93.1 FM Best Remix Award	Nominated	
Deezer Monitor Music Awards	2021	"Pa' Ti"	Best Female Pop Song	Nominated	
Diversity Awards (Note: These awards are administered by the Multicultural Motion Picture Association.)	1997	Jennifer Lopez	Nova Award	Won	
Dorian Awards	2016	The Boy Next Door	Campy Flick of the Year	Nominated	
Dorian Awards	2020	Hustlers	Film of the Year	Nominated	
Dorian Awards	2020	Hustlers	Supporting Film Performance of the Year — Actress	Won	
Dorian TV Awards	2020	Super Bowl LIV halftime show (with Shakira)	Best TV Musical Performance	Nominated	
Dublin Film Critics' Circle Awards	2019	Hustlers	Best Actress	9th place	
Dublin Film Critics' Circle Awards	2019	Hustlers	Best Film	8th place	
E!'s Entertainer of the Year Award	2001	Jennifer Lopez	Entertainer of the Year	Runner-up	
Echo Awards	2000	On the 6	International Newcomer of the Year	Nominated	
Echo Awards	2002	J.Lo	International Artist of the Year	Nominated	
Echo Awards	2012	"On the Floor" (featuring Pitbull)	Hit of the Year	Nominated	
Elle Women in Hollywood	2023	Jennifer Lopez	Icon Award	Won	
EMMA Awards	2000	On the 6	Best International Music Act/Production	Nominated	
Empire Awards	1999	Out of Sight	Best Actress	Nominated	
Entertainment Tonight	2015	Jennifer Lopez	Icon Award	Won	
FiFi Awards	2002	Jennifer Lopez	Celebrity Fragrance Star of the Year	Won	
FiFi Awards	2003	Jennifer Lopez	Celebrity Fragrance Star of the Year	Won	
FiFi Awards	2004	Still Jennifer Lopez	Top Ten – Women's: Luxe	Nominated	
Florida Film Critics Circle Awards	2019	Hustlers	Best Supporting Actress	Nominated	
Georgia Film Critics Association Awards	2020	Hustlers	Best Supporting Actress	Nominated	
GLAAD Media Awards	2014	Jennifer Lopez	GLAAD Vanguard Award	Won	
GLAAD Media Awards	2014	The Fosters	Outstanding Drama Series	Won	
Glamour Awards	1999	Jennifer Lopez	Woman of the Year	Won	
Glamour Awards	2011	Jennifer Lopez	Woman of the Year	Won	
Glamour Awards	2012	American Idol	TV Personality	Nominated	
Glamour Beauty Awards	2023	JLo Beauty (Hydrafacial)	The Best Beauty Innovators of 2023	Won	
Gold Derby Awards	2020	Hustlers	Best Supporting Actress	Nominated	
Golden Raspberry Awards	2002	The Wedding Planner and Angel Eyes	Worst Actress	Nominated	
Golden Raspberry Awards	2003	Maid in Manhattan and Enough	Worst Actress	Nominated	
Golden Raspberry Awards	2004	Gigli	Worst Actress	Won	
Golden Raspberry Awards	2004	Gigli (with Ben Affleck)	Worst Screen Couple	Won	
Golden Raspberry Awards	2006	Monster-In-Law	Worst Actress	Nominated	
Golden Raspberry Awards	2010	Jennifer Lopez	Worst Actress of the Decade	Nominated	
Golden Raspberry Awards	2013	What to Expect When You're Expecting	Worst Supporting Actress	Nominated	
Golden Raspberry Awards	2016	The Boy Next Door	Worst Actress	Nominated	
Golden Raspberry Awards	2020	Hustlers	Razzie Redeemer Award	Nominated	
Golden Raspberry Awards	2024	The Mother	Worst Actress	Nominated	
Golden Raspberry Awards	2025	Atlas	Worst Actress	Nominated	
Golden Schmoes Awards	2019	Hustlers	Best Supporting Actress	Nominated	
Golden Schmoes Awards	2019	Hustlers	Best T&A of the Year	Won	
Gotham Awards	2019	Hustlers	Best Feature	Nominated	
Gotham Awards	2019	Hustlers	Audience Award	Nominated	
Groovevolt Music & Fashion Awards	2004	This Is Me... Then	Best Album – Female	Nominated	
Groovevolt Music & Fashion Awards	2004	"All I Have" (with LL Cool J)	Best Collaboration, Duo or Group	Nominated	
Groovevolt Music & Fashion Awards	2004	"I'm Glad"	Video of the Year	Nominated	
Groovevolt Music & Fashion Awards	2004	Jennifer Lopez	Most Fashionable Artist	Nominated	
Groovevolt Music & Fashion Awards	2006	Jennifer Lopez	Most Fashionable Artist	Won	
Groovevolt Music & Fashion Awards	2006	"Get Right" (featuring Fabolous)	Best Song - Group or Collaboration	Nominated	
Groovevolt Music & Fashion Awards	2006	"Get Right" (featuring Fabolous)	Most Fashionable Music Video	Nominated	
Guinness World Records	1998	Jennifer Lopez	First Latina to Earn $1 Million for a Film Role	Won	
Guinness World Records	2003	J to tha L–O! The Remixes	First Number-One Remix Album on the Billboard 200	Won	
Guinness World Records	2007	Jennifer Lopez	World's Most Powerful Actress (Note: For having an estimated net worth of $250 million at the time.)	Won	
Guinness World Records	2012	"On the Floor" (featuring Pitbull)	Highest Viewed Female Music Video of All Time	Won	
Guinness World Records	2012	"On the Floor" (featuring Pitbull)	First Music Video Ending Voted For by Fans on American Idol	Won	
Guinness World Records	2014	Jennifer Lopez	Most Twitter Followers for an Actress	Won	
Heat Latin Music Awards	2015	"Adrenalina" (with Wisin and Ricky Martin)	Mejor Video Musical	Nominated	
Hispanic Federation	2024	Jennifer Lopez	Premio Orgullo	Recipient	
Hollywood Critics Association Awards	2020	Hustlers	Best Supporting Actress	Won	
Hollywood Music in Media Awards	2022	"On My Way (Marry Me)"	Best Song – Onscreen Performance (Film)	Nominated	
Hollywood Music in Media Awards	2022	Marry Me Live Concert Special	Live Concert for Visual Media	Nominated	
Hollywood Music in Media Awards	2022	Marry Me	Soundtrack Album	Nominated	
Hollywood Walk of Fame	2013	Jennifer Lopez	Star on Hollywood Walk of Fame (Recording Category)	Won	
Houston Film Critics Society Awards	2016	The Boy Next Door	Worst Film	Nominated	
Human Rights Campaign	2013	Jennifer Lopez	Ally for Equality Award	Won	
Hungarian Music Awards	2002	J.Lo	Foreign Pop Album of the Year	Nominated	
IFPI Top Sales Music Award, Hong Kong	2001	J.Lo	Ten Best Sales Releases, Foreign	Won	
IFPI Top Sales Music Award, Hong Kong	2003	This Is Me... Then	Ten Best Sales Releases, Foreign	Won	
IGN Movie Awards	2019	Hustlers	Best Supporting Performer in a Movie in 2019	Nominated	
iHeartRadio Fiesta Latina	2019	Jennifer Lopez	iHeartRadio Premio Corazón Award	Won	
iHeartRadio MMVAs	2011	Jennifer Lopez	International Video Of The Year – Artist	Nominated	
iHeartRadio Music Awards	2016	Jennifer Lopez	Best Triple Threat	Nominated	
iHeartRadio Music Awards	2022	Jennifer Lopez	Icon Award	Won	
iHeartRadio Music Awards	2023	Jennifer Lopez: Halftime	Favorite Documentary	Nominated	
Imagen Awards	1998	Selena	Lasting Image Award	Won	
Imagen Awards	2003	Maid in Manhattan	Best Actress	Nominated	
Imagen Awards	2016	Jennifer Lopez	Powerful & Influential Latinos in Entertainment (Honoree)	Won	
Imagen Awards	2016	Shades of Blue	Best Primetime Television Program – Drama	Nominated	
Imagen Awards	2016	Shades of Blue	Best Actress – Television	Nominated	
Imagen Awards	2017	Shades of Blue	Best Primetime Television Program – Drama	Nominated	
Imagen Awards	2017	Shades of Blue	Best Actress – Television	Nominated	
Imagen Awards	2018	Shades of Blue	Best Primetime Television Program – Drama	Nominated	
Imagen Awards	2018	Shades of Blue	Best Actress – Television	Nominated	
Imagen Awards	2019	Shades of Blue	Best Primetime Television Program – Drama	Nominated	
Imagen Awards	2019	Second Act	Best Actress – Feature Film	Nominated	
Imagen Awards	2020	Hustlers	Best Actress – Feature Film	Won	
Imagen Awards	2025	Unstoppable	Best Supporting Actress	Nominated	
Independent Spirit Awards	1996	My Family	Best Supporting Female	Nominated	
Independent Spirit Awards	2020	Hustlers	Best Supporting Female	Nominated	
IndieWire Critics Poll	2019	Hustlers	Best Supporting Actress	Runner-up	
IndieWire Honors	2024	Unstoppable	Maverick Award	Won	
International Dance Music Awards	2000	Jennifer Lopez	Best New Dance Artist	Won	
International Dance Music Awards	2000	"Waiting for Tonight"	Best Dance Video	Won	
International Dance Music Awards	2007	"Control Myself" (with LL Cool J)	Best Rap/Hip Hop Dance Track	Nominated	
International Dance Music Awards	2012	"On the Floor" (featuring Pitbull)	Best Latin/Reggaeton Track	Nominated	
International Dance Music Awards	2012	"On the Floor" (featuring Pitbull)	Best Commercial/Dance Pop Track	Nominated	
International Dance Music Awards	2013	"Dance Again" (featuring Pitbull)	Best Latin Dance Track	Nominated	
International Dance Music Awards	2015	"Booty" (featuring Iggy Azalea)	Best Commercial/Pop Dance Track	Nominated	
Italian Music Awards	2001	Jennifer Lopez	Best International Female Artist	Nominated	
Italian Music Awards	2003	Jennifer Lopez	Best International Female Artist	Nominated	
Kiss Awards	2005	Jennifer Lopez	Style Icon	Nominated	
Latin American Music Awards	2015	"Back It Up" (with Prince Royce)	Favorite Dance Song	Nominated	
Latin American Music Awards	2016	"El Mismo Sol" (with Álvaro Soler)	Favorite Pop/Rock Song	Nominated	
Latin American Music Awards	2017	"Olvídame y Pega la Vuelta" (with Marc Anthony)	Favorite Tropical Song	Nominated	
Latin American Music Awards	2018	Jennifer Lopez: All I Have	Favorite Tour	Nominated	
Latin American Music Awards	2018	Jennifer Lopez	Favorite Female Artist	Nominated	
Latin American Music Awards	2019	It's My Party	Favorite Tour	Nominated	
Latin American Music Awards	2021	Jennifer Lopez	Social Artist of the Year	Nominated	
Latino Entertainment Film Awards (Note: These awards are administered by the Latino Entertainment Journalists Association.)	2020	Hustlers	Best Picture	Nominated	
Latino Entertainment Film Awards	2020	Hustlers	Best Supporting Actress	Won	
Latino Entertainment Film Awards	2020	Jennifer Lopez	Rita Moreno Lifetime Achievement Award	Won	
Lo Nuestro Awards	2000	Jennifer Lopez and Marc Anthony	Pop Group or Duo of the Year	Nominated	
Lo Nuestro Awards	2000	Jennifer Lopez	Pop Female Artist of the Year	Nominated	
Lo Nuestro Awards	2000	Jennifer Lopez	Pop New Artist of the Year	Nominated	
Lo Nuestro Awards	2008	Jennifer Lopez	Pop New Artist of the Year	Won	
Lo Nuestro Awards	2013	"Follow the Leader" (with Wisin & Yandel)	Video of the Year	Nominated	
Lo Nuestro Awards	2015	"Adrenalina" (with Wisin and Ricky Martin)	Urban Song of the Year	Nominated	
Lo Nuestro Awards	2015	"Adrenalina" (with Wisin and Ricky Martin)	Urban Collaboration of the Year	Nominated	
Lo Nuestro Awards	2015	"Adrenalina" (with Wisin and Ricky Martin)	Video of the Year	Nominated	
Lo Nuestro Awards	2019	Jennifer Lopez	Social Media Artist	Won	
Lo Nuestro Awards	2021	Jennifer Lopez	Pop Artist of the Year	Nominated	
London Film Critics' Circle Awards	2020	Hustlers	Supporting Actress of the Year	Nominated	
Lone Star Film Awards	1997	Selena	Best Actress	Won	
Los Angeles Film Critics Association Awards	2019	Hustlers	Best Supporting Actress	Won	
Los Premios MTV Latinoamérica	2007	Jennifer Lopez	MTV Tr3́s Viewer's Choice Award – Best Pop Artist	Nominated	
LOS40 Music Awards	2007	Jennifer Lopez	Mejor Artista (Best Artist)	Nominated	
LOS40 Music Awards	2007	"Qué Hiciste"	Mejor Canción (Best Song)	Nominated	
LOS40 Music Awards	2011	"On the Floor" (featuring Pitbull)	Best International Song	Nominated	
LOS40 Music Awards	2012	Jennifer Lopez	Best Latin Artist	Nominated	
LOS40 Music Awards	2013	Jennifer Lopez	Best Latin Artist	Nominated	
LOS40 Music Awards	2014	Jennifer Lopez	Best Latin Artist	Nominated	
LOS40 Music Awards	2016	Jennifer Lopez	Best International Artist	Nominated	
LOS40 Music Awards	2016	"Ain't Your Mama"	Best International Song	Nominated	
LOS40 Music Awards	2016	"Ain't Your Mama"	Best International Video	Nominated	
M6 Awards	2000	Jennifer Lopez	International Revelation	Nominated	
March of Dimes	2013	Jennifer Lopez (for the Lopez Family Foundation)	Grace Kelly Award	Won	
Mi TRL Music Awards	2007	Jennifer Lopez	Chica of the Year (Female of the Year)	Nominated	
Mi TRL Music Awards	2007	Jennifer Lopez	So You Think You Can Act?	Nominated	
MOBO Awards	2000	"Feelin' So Good"	Best Video	Nominated	
MTV Asia Awards	2002	Jennifer Lopez	Favorite Female Artist	Nominated	
MTV Asia Awards	2003	Jennifer Lopez	Favorite Female Artist	Nominated	
MTV Asia Awards	2004	Jennifer Lopez	Favorite Female Artist	Nominated	
MTV Europe Music Awards	1999	Jennifer Lopez	Breakthrough Artist	Nominated	
MTV Europe Music Awards	1999	Jennifer Lopez	Best R&B Artist	Nominated	
MTV Europe Music Awards	2000	Jennifer Lopez	Best Female Artist	Nominated	
MTV Europe Music Awards	2000	Jennifer Lopez	Best R&B Artist	Won	
MTV Europe Music Awards	2001	Jennifer Lopez	Best Female Artist	Won	
MTV Europe Music Awards	2002	Jennifer Lopez	Best R&B Artist	Nominated	
MTV Europe Music Awards	2002	Jennifer Lopez	Best Female Artist	Won	
MTV Europe Music Awards	2003	Jennifer Lopez	Best R&B Artist	Nominated	
MTV Europe Music Awards	2011	"On the Floor" (featuring Pitbull)	Best Song	Nominated	
MTV Europe Music Awards	2011	Jennifer Lopez	Best Female Artist	Nominated	
MTV Movie & TV Awards	1998	Selena	Best Breakthrough Performance	Nominated	
MTV Movie & TV Awards	1999	Out of Sight	Best Female Performance	Nominated	
MTV Movie & TV Awards	1999	Out of Sight (with George Clooney)	Best Kiss	Nominated	
MTV Movie & TV Awards	2001	The Cell	Best Female Performance	Nominated	
MTV Movie & TV Awards	2001	The Cell	Best Dressed	Won	
MTV Movie & TV Awards	2011	The Back-up Plan	Best Latino Actor	Nominated	
MTV Movie & TV Awards	2015	The Boy Next Door	Best Scared-As-S**t Performance	Won	
MTV Movie & TV Awards	2022	"On My Way"	Best Song	Won	
MTV Movie & TV Awards	2022	Jennifer Lopez	MTV Generation Award	Won	
MTV Style Awards	2004	Jennifer Lopez	Most Influential International Artist	Nominated	
MTV Video Music Awards	1999	"If You Had My Love"	Best Female Video	Nominated	
MTV Video Music Awards	1999	"If You Had My Love"	Best Dance Video	Nominated	
MTV Video Music Awards	1999	"If You Had My Love"	Best Pop Video	Nominated	
MTV Video Music Awards	1999	"If You Had My Love"	Best New Artist in a Video	Nominated	
MTV Video Music Awards	1999	www.jenniferlopez.com	Best Artist Website	Nominated	
MTV Video Music Awards	2000	"Waiting for Tonight"	Best Dance Video	Won	
MTV Video Music Awards	2000	"Waiting for Tonight"	Best Choreography in a Video	Nominated	
MTV Video Music Awards	2001	"Love Don't Cost a Thing"	Best Female Video	Nominated	
MTV Video Music Awards	2001	"Love Don't Cost a Thing"	Best Dance Video	Nominated	
MTV Video Music Awards	2002	"I'm Real (Murder Remix)"	Best Hip-Hop Video	Won	
MTV Video Music Awards	2003	"I'm Glad"	Best Female Video	Nominated	
MTV Video Music Awards	2003	"I'm Glad"	Best Dance Video	Nominated	
MTV Video Music Awards	2003	"I'm Glad"	Best Choreography in a Video	Nominated	
MTV Video Music Awards	2003	"I'm Glad"	Best Art Direction in a Video	Nominated	
MTV Video Music Awards	2005	"Get Right"	Best Dance Video	Nominated	
MTV Video Music Awards	2005	"Get Right"	Best Direction in a Video	Nominated	
MTV Video Music Awards	2005	"Get Right"	Best Choreography in a Video	Nominated	
MTV Video Music Awards	2005	"Get Right"	Best Editing in a Video	Nominated	
MTV Video Music Awards	2012	"Dance Again"	Best Choreography	Nominated	
MTV Video Music Awards	2012	Jennifer Lopez	Best Latino Artist	Nominated	
MTV Video Music Awards	2013	"Live It Up"	Best Choreography	Nominated	
MTV Video Music Awards	2018	"Dinero"	Best Collaboration	Won	
MTV Video Music Awards	2018	"Dinero"	Best Latin	Nominated	
MTV Video Music Awards	2018	Jennifer Lopez	Michael Jackson Video Vanguard Award	Won	
MTV Video Music Awards Japan	2003	"Jenny From The Block"	Best Female Music Video	Nominated	
MTV Video Music Awards Japan	2005	"Get Right"	Best Female Music Video	Nominated	
MTV Video Music Awards Japan	2014	"Live It Up"	Best Collaboration	Nominated	
MTV Video Play Awards	2012	"On the Floor" (featuring Pitbull)	Platinum Award	Won	
MTV Video Play Awards	2013	"Dance Again" (featuring Pitbull)	Platinum Award	Won	
MVPA Awards	2000	"Waiting for Tonight"	Pop Video of the Year	Nominated	
MVPA Awards	2000	"Waiting for Tonight"	Best Hair	Won	
MVPA Awards	2005	"Get Right"	Choreography	Nominated	
MVPA Awards	2005	"Get Right"	Styling	Nominated	
MVPA Awards	2005	"Get Right"	Make-Up	Nominated	
My VH1 Music Awards	2000	Jennifer Lopez	Woman of the Year	Nominated	
My VH1 Music Awards	2000	Jennifer Lopez	Booty Shake	Nominated	
My VH1 Music Awards	2000	"Waiting for Tonight"	Sexxxiest Video	Nominated	
My VH1 Music Awards	2000	The Cell	Double Threat (Musician-Actors)	Nominated	
My VH1 Music Awards	2001	Jennifer Lopez	Navel Academy	Nominated	
My VH1 Music Awards	2001	"Love Don't Cost a Thing"	Is It Hot in Here or Is It Just My Video	Nominated	
My VH1 Music Awards	2001	"What's Going On" (with various artists)	There's No "I" in Team (Best Collaboration)	Won	
NAACP Image Awards	2003	Maid in Manhattan	Outstanding Actress in a Motion Picture	Nominated	
NAACP Image Awards	2020	Hustlers	Outstanding Supporting Actress in a Motion Picture	Nominated	
NAMIC Vision Awards	2018	Shades of Blue	Best Performance – Drama	Nominated	
National Film & TV Awards	2019	Hustlers	Best Actress	Won	
National Society of Film Critics Awards	2020	Hustlers	Best Supporting Actress	3rd place	
New York Film Critics Online Awards	2019	Hustlers	Top 10 Films	Won	
New York Latin ACE Awards	1999	Out of Sight	Best Actress	Nominated	
New York Latin ACE Awards	1999	Jennifer Lopez	Special Recognition	Won	
Nickelodeon Kids' Choice Awards	2000	Jennifer Lopez	Favorite New Music Artist	Won	
Nickelodeon Kids' Choice Awards	2000	Jennifer Lopez	Favorite Female Singer	Nominated	
Nickelodeon Kids' Choice Awards	2001	Jennifer Lopez	Favorite Female Singer	Nominated	
Nickelodeon Kids' Choice Awards	2002	The Wedding Planner	Favorite Movie Actress	Won	
Nickelodeon Kids' Choice Awards	2002	Jennifer Lopez	Favorite Female Singer	Nominated	
Nickelodeon Kids' Choice Awards	2003	Maid in Manhattan	Favorite Movie Actress	Nominated	
Nickelodeon Kids' Choice Awards	2003	Jennifer Lopez	Favorite Female Singer	Nominated	
Nickelodeon Kids' Choice Awards	2003	"Jenny from the Block"	Favorite Song	Nominated	
Nickelodeon Kids' Choice Awards	2004	Jennifer Lopez	Favorite Female Singer	Nominated	
Nickelodeon Kids' Choice Awards	2016	Home	Favorite Voice from an Animated Movie	Nominated	
Nickelodeon Kids' Choice Awards	2019	World of Dance (with Derek Hough and Ne-Yo)	Favorite TV Judges	Nominated	
NRJ Music Awards	2001	Jennifer Lopez	International Female Artist of the Year	Nominated	
NRJ Music Awards	2002	Jennifer Lopez	International Female Artist of the Year	Won	
NRJ Music Awards	2003	JenniferLopez.com	Music Website of the Year	Won	
NRJ Music Awards	2003	Jennifer Lopez	International Female Artist of the Year	Nominated	
NRJ Music Awards	2003	J to tha L–O! The Remixes	International Album of the Year	Nominated	
NRJ Music Awards	2026	"Save Me Tonight" (with David Guetta)	International Collaboration of the Year	Pending	
NRJ Radio Awards	2001	Jennifer Lopez	Best International Female	Nominated	
Online Film Critics Society Awards	2020	Hustlers	Best Supporting Actress	Won	
Palm Springs International Film Festival	2020	Hustlers	Spotlight Award	Won	
Palm Springs International Film Festival	2024	Unstoppable	Legend & Groundbreaker Award	Won	
People's Choice Awards	2001	Jennifer Lopez	Favorite Female Musical Performer	Nominated	
People's Choice Awards	2001	The Cell	Favorite Motion Picture Actress	Nominated	
People's Choice Awards	2002	Angel Eyes	Favorite Motion Picture Actress	Nominated	
People's Choice Awards	2002	Jennifer Lopez	Favorite Female Musical Performer	Nominated	
People's Choice Awards	2003	Jennifer Lopez	Favorite Female Musical Performer	Nominated	
People's Choice Awards	2005	Jennifer Lopez	Best Smile	Nominated	
People's Choice Awards	2013	American Idol	Favorite Celebrity Judge	Nominated	
People's Choice Awards	2015	Jennifer Lopez	Favorite Pop Artist	Nominated	
People's Choice Awards	2016	The Boy Next Door	Favorite Dramatic Movie Actress	Nominated	
People's Choice Awards	2016	The Boy Next Door	Favorite Thriller Movie	Nominated	
People's Choice Awards	2017	Shades of Blue	Favorite TV Crime Drama Actress	Won	
People's Choice Awards	2019	Jennifer Lopez	The Style Star of 2019	Nominated	
People's Choice Awards	2019	It's My Party	The Concert Tour of 2019	Nominated	
People's Choice Awards	2020	Hustlers and the Super Bowl LIV halftime show	People's Icon Award	Won	
People's Choice Awards	2022	Jennifer Lopez	The Female Movie Star of 2022	Nominated	
People's Choice Awards	2022	Jennifer Lopez	The Comedy Movie Star of 2022	Nominated	
People Magazine Awards	2014	Jennifer Lopez	Triple Threat Award	Won	
People en Español Awards	2010	Jennifer Lopez	Best Dressed of the Year	Won	
People en Español Awards	2011	Jennifer Lopez and Marc Anthony	Separation of the Year	Won	
People en Español Awards	2012	Jennifer Lopez	Best Female Singer	Nominated	
People en Español Awards	2012	Jennifer Lopez	Queen of Facebook	Nominated	
People en Español Awards	2012	"Follow the Leader" (with Wisin & Yandel)	Video of the Year	Won	
People en Español Awards	2013	"Live It Up" (with Pitbull)	Best Collaboration of the Year	Nominated	
People en Español Awards	2013	"Live It Up" (with Pitbull)	Best Video of the Year	Nominated	
People en Español Awards	2014	Jennifer Lopez	Selfie of the Year	Nominated	
People en Español Awards	2014	Jennifer Lopez	Bikinazo of the Year	Nominated	
Pollstar Awards	2018	Jennifer Lopez: All I Have	Best Residency	Nominated	
Pollstar Awards	2019	It's My Party	Best Latin Tour	Won	
Pollstar Awards	2021	Jennifer Lopez	Latin Touring Artist of the Decade	Won	
Premios Amigo	1999	Jennifer Lopez	Best Latin Female Soloist	Nominated	
Premios Amigo	2000	On the 6	Best International Album	Nominated	
Premios Amigo	2001	Jennifer Lopez	Best Latin Female Soloist	Nominated	
Premios Amigo	2007	Jennifer Lopez	Premio Amigo Artista Latino Más Vendido	Won	
Premios Amigo	2007	"Qué Hiciste"	Canción Más Descargada (Most Downloaded Song)	Nominated	
Premios Amigo	2007	"Qué Hiciste"	Tono Más Descargado (Most Downloaded Tone)	Nominated	
Premios Globo	1999	Jennifer Lopez	Female Artist of the Year	Nominated	
Premios Globo	1999	On the 6	Album of the Year	Nominated	
Premios Globo	1999	"No Me Ames"	Song of the Year	Nominated	
Premios Juventud	2004	Jennifer Lopez	She Steals the Show	Nominated	
Premios Juventud	2004	Jennifer Lopez	Best Moves	Nominated	
Premios Juventud	2004	Jennifer Lopez	All Over the Dial	Nominated	
Premios Juventud	2004	Jennifer Lopez	She's Totally Red Carpet	Won	
Premios Juventud	2004	Jennifer Lopez	Paparazzi's Favorite Target	Nominated	
Premios Juventud	2004	Jennifer Lopez	Dream Chick	Nominated	
Premios Juventud	2004	Jennifer Lopez	My Idol Is	Nominated	
Premios Juventud	2004	Jennifer Lopez and Marc Anthony	Paparazzi's Favorite Target	Won	
Premios Juventud	2004	Jennifer Lopez and Marc Anthony	Dynamic Duet	Nominated	
Premios Juventud	2004	Jennifer Lopez and Marc Anthony	Hottest Romance	Nominated	
Premios Juventud	2004	Jennifer Lopez and Ben Affleck	Hottest Romance	Nominated	
Premios Juventud	2004	"No Me Ames"	Catchiest Tune	Nominated	
Premios Juventud	2005	Jennifer Lopez	She's Got Style	Won	
Premios Juventud	2005	Shall We Dance? and Monster-in-Law	She Steals the Show	Won	
Premios Juventud	2005	Jennifer Lopez	Paparazzi's Favorite Target	Nominated	
Premios Juventud	2005	"Escapémonos (Tropical Version)" (with Marc Anthony)	Dynamic Duet	Nominated	
Premios Juventud	2005	Jennifer Lopez and Marc Anthony	Hottest Romance	Nominated	
Premios Juventud	2006	Jennifer Lopez	She's Got Style	Nominated	
Premios Juventud	2006	An Unfinished Life	She Steals the Show	Nominated	
Premios Juventud	2007	Jennifer Lopez	She's Got Style	Won	
Premios Juventud	2007	Jennifer Lopez	Paparazzi's Favorite Target	Nominated	
Premios Juventud	2007	Jennifer Lopez	Girl of My Dreams	Won	
Premios Juventud	2008	Jennifer Lopez	She's Got Style	Won	
Premios Juventud	2008	Jennifer Lopez	Girl of My Dreams	Won	
Premios Juventud	2008	Jennifer Lopez	Paparazzi's Favorite Target	Won	
Premios Juventud	2008	El Cantante	She Steals the Show	Nominated	
Premios Juventud	2008	El Cantante	Favorite Flick	Nominated	
Premios Juventud	2008	Jennifer Lopez and Marc Anthony	Torrid Affairs	Nominated	
Premios Juventud	2009	Jennifer Lopez	She's Got Style	Won	
Premios Juventud	2011	"On the Floor" (with Pitbull)	The Perfect Combination	Nominated	
Premios Juventud	2011	Jennifer Lopez	Actress Who Steals The Screen	Nominated	
Premios Juventud	2013	Jennifer Lopez	World Icon Award	Won	
Premios Juventud	2013	Jennifer Lopez	Favorite Actress	Won	
Premios Juventud	2014	"Adrenalina" (Wisin featuring Ricky Martin and Jennifer Lopez)	The Perfect Combination	Nominated	
Premios Juventud	2015	The Boy Next Door	She Steals the Show	Won	
Premios Juventud	2015	The Boy Next Door	Favorite Movie	Won	
Premios Juventud	2016	"Back It Up" (featuring Prince Royce & Pitbull)	The Perfect Combination	Nominated	
Premios Juventud	2016	Jennifer Lopez	She Steals the Show	Won	
Premios Juventud	2016	Jennifer Lopez	My Favorite Twitter Celebrity	Nominated	
Premios Juventud	2019	Jennifer Lopez	Scroll Stopper	Nominated	
Premios Juventud	2019	Jennifer Lopez	Street Style	Nominated	
Premios Juventud	2019	Jennifer Lopez	Hair Obsessed	Nominated	
Premios Juventud	2019	Jennifer Lopez and Alex Rodriguez	Couple That Fired Up My Feed	Nominated	
Premios Juventud	2020	Jennifer Lopez	Can't Get Enough	Nominated	
Premios Juventud	2020	Jennifer Lopez	High Fashion	Nominated	
Premios Juventud	2020	Jennifer Lopez	Hair Obsessed	Nominated	
Premios Ondas	2001	Jennifer Lopez	Mención especial de la Organización	Won	
Premios Oye!	2007	Jennifer Lopez	Pop Español: Solista Femenina	Nominated	
Premios Tu Música Urbano	2019	"Te Guste" (with Bad Bunny)	Collaboration of the Year – International	Nominated	
Premios Tu Música Urbano	2019	"Te Bote Remix II" (with Casper Mágico, Nio García, Cosculluela, Wisin & Yandel)	Remix of the Year – International	Nominated	
Radio Disney Music Awards	2015	Jennifer Lopez	Hero Award	Won	
Radio Music Awards	2001	Jennifer Lopez	Artist of the Year – Top 40 Radio	Nominated	
Radio Music Awards	2001	"I'm Real"	Song of the Year – Hip Hop/Rhythmic	Nominated	
Radio Music Awards	2003	Jennifer Lopez	Artist of the Year – Hip Hop Radio	Nominated	
Radio Music Awards	2003	Jennifer Lopez	Artist of the Year – Top 40 Radio	Nominated	
Radio Music Awards	2003	"Baby I Love U!"	Best Hook-Up Song	Nominated	
Ritmo Latino Music Awards	1999	Jennifer Lopez	New Artist of the Year	Won	
Ritmo Latino Music Awards	1999	"No Me Ames"	Video of the Year	Nominated	
The ReFrame Stamp	2019	Second Act	Narrative Feature	Won	
The ReFrame Stamp	2020	Hustlers	Narrative Feature	Won	
RTHK International Pop Poll Awards	2012	"On the Floor" (featuring Pitbull)	Top Ten International Gold Songs	Nominated	
San Francisco Bay Area Film Critics Circle Awards	2019	Hustlers	Best Supporting Actress	Won	
Satellite Awards	2020	Hustlers	Best Actress in a Supporting Role	Won	
Saturn Awards	1998	Anaconda	Saturn Award for Best Actress	Nominated	
Saturn Awards	2001	The Cell	Saturn Award for Best Actress	Nominated	
Savannah Film Festival	2025	Kiss of the Spider Woman	Virtuoso Award	Won	
Seattle Film Critics Society Awards	2019	Hustlers	Best Supporting Actress	Won	
Shorty Awards	2011	Jennifer Lopez	Celebrity	Nominated	
Shorty Awards	2011	Jennifer Lopez	Music	Nominated	
Shorty Awards	2011	Jennifer Lopez	Actress	Nominated	
Shorty Awards	2011	Jennifer Lopez	Singer	Nominated	
ShoWest Convention Awards	2002	Jennifer Lopez	Female Star of the Year	Won	
Smash Hits Poll Winners Party	1999	Jennifer Lopez	Most Fancied Female	Nominated	
Smash Hits Poll Winners Party	1999	Jennifer Lopez	Best Legs Award	Nominated	
Smash Hits Poll Winners Party	2002	Jennifer Lopez	Best Female Solo	7th place	
Smash Hits Poll Winners Party	2002	Jennifer Lopez	Most Fanciable Female	5th place	
Soul Train Lady of Soul Awards	2000	"If You Had My Love"	Best R&B/Soul or Rap New Artist, Solo	Nominated	
Soul Train Music Awards	2000	On the 6	Best R&B/Soul Album – Female	Nominated	
Stinkers Bad Movie Awards	2001	Angel Eyes and The Wedding Planner	Worst Actress	Nominated	
Stinkers Bad Movie Awards	2001	Angel Eyes	Most Annoying Fake Accent – Female	Won	
Stinkers Bad Movie Awards	2002	Enough	Worst Actress	Nominated	
Stinkers Bad Movie Awards	2003	Gigli	Worst Actress	Won	
Stinkers Bad Movie Awards	2003	Gigli	Worst Fake Accent – Female	Won	
Stinkers Bad Movie Awards	2003	Gigli (with Ben Affleck)	Worst On-Screen Couple	Won	
Streamy Awards	2018	Fear BOX Challenge (with David Dobrik)	Best Performance – Collaboration	Nominated	
Swiss Music Awards	2012	"On the Floor" (featuring Pitbull)	Best Hit International	Nominated	
Teen Choice Awards	1999	"If You Had My Love"	Best Song of the Summer	Won	
Teen Choice Awards	1999	Jennifer Lopez	Breakout Artist	Nominated	
Teen Choice Awards	2000	Jennifer Lopez	Female Hottie Award	Nominated	
Teen Choice Awards	2000	Jennifer Lopez	Female Artist	Nominated	
Teen Choice Awards	2001	"Play"	Best Dance Track	Won	
Teen Choice Awards	2001	Jennifer Lopez	Female Hottie Award	Won	
Teen Choice Awards	2001	Jennifer Lopez	Female Artist	Nominated	
Teen Choice Awards	2001	The Wedding Planner	Choice Chemistry	Nominated	
Teen Choice Awards	2001	"Love Don't Cost a Thing"	Choice Music Single	Nominated	
Teen Choice Awards	2001	J.Lo	Choice Music Album	Nominated	
Teen Choice Awards	2002	Jennifer Lopez	Female Artist	Nominated	
Teen Choice Awards	2002	Jennifer Lopez	Female Hottie Awards	Nominated	
Teen Choice Awards	2002	"Ain't It Funny (Murder Remix)" (featuring Ja Rule and Caddillac Tah)	Choice Music Hook-Up	Nominated	
Teen Choice Awards	2002	"Ain't It Funny (Murder Remix)" (featuring Ja Rule and Caddillac Tah)	Choice Music Single	Nominated	
Teen Choice Awards	2002	"Ain't It Funny (Murder Remix)" (featuring Ja Rule and Caddillac Tah)	Best R&B/Hip-Hop/Rap Single	Won	
Teen Choice Awards	2002	Enough	Choice Actress in a Drama/Action or Adventure Film	Nominated	
Teen Choice Awards	2003	Maid in Manhattan	Choice Movie Actress – Comedy	Nominated	
Teen Choice Awards	2003	Maid in Manhattan	Choice Movie Liar	Nominated	
Teen Choice Awards	2003	Maid in Manhattan (shared with Ralph Fiennes)	Choice Movie Lip-Lock	Nominated	
Teen Choice Awards	2003	"All I Have" (featuring LL Cool J)	Choice Music Single	Nominated	
Teen Choice Awards	2003	"All I Have" (featuring LL Cool J)	Choice Music Hook-Up	Nominated	
Teen Choice Awards	2003	"I'm Glad"	Choice Love Song	Nominated	
Teen Choice Awards	2003	This Is Me... Then	Choice Music Album	Nominated	
Teen Choice Awards	2003	Jennifer Lopez	Choice Hip Hop R&B Artist	Won	
Teen Choice Awards	2003	Jennifer Lopez	Choice Crossover Artist	Nominated	
Teen Choice Awards	2003	Jennifer Lopez	Choice Fashion Icon	Won	
Teen Choice Awards	2003	Jennifer Lopez	Female Artist	Nominated	
Teen Choice Awards	2003	Jennifer Lopez	Female Hottie Award	Nominated	
Teen Choice Awards	2004	Jennifer Lopez	Female Artist	Nominated	
Teen Choice Awards	2005	"Get Right"	Choice R&B/Hip-Hop Track	Nominated	
Teen Choice Awards	2005	"Get Right"	Choice Party Starter	Nominated	
Teen Choice Awards	2005	Monster-in-Law (with Jane Fonda)	Choice Chemistry	Nominated	
Teen Choice Awards	2005	Monster-in-Law	Choice Movie Actress: Comedy	Nominated	
Teen Choice Awards	2005	Shall We Dance? (shared with Richard Gere)	Choice Dance Scene	Nominated	
Teen Choice Awards	2005	Jennifer Lopez	Choice Red-Carpet Fashion Icon (Female)	Nominated	
Teen Choice Awards	2010	The Back-up Plan	Best Romantic Comedy Actress	Nominated	
Teen Choice Awards	2010	The Back-up Plan	Best Romantic Comedy	Nominated	
Teen Choice Awards	2011	Jennifer Lopez	Choice Red Carpet Fashion Icon (Female)	Nominated	
Teen Choice Awards	2011	American Idol	Choice TV: Personality	Won	
Teen Choice Awards	2012	What to Expect When You're Expecting	Choice Comedy Actress	Nominated	
Teen Choice Awards	2012	"Dance Again" (featuring Pitbull)	Choice Music Single – Female	Nominated	
Teen Choice Awards	2012	Jennifer Lopez	Choice Female Artist	Nominated	
Teen Choice Awards	2012	Jennifer Lopez	Choice Fashion Icon: Female	Nominated	
Teen Choice Awards	2012	Jennifer Lopez	Choice Summer Female Artist	Nominated	
Teen Choice Awards	2012	American Idol	Female TV Personality	Won	
Teen Choice Awards	2013	The Fosters	Choice TV Breakout Show (shared with cast and crew)	Won	
Teen Choice Awards	2014	American Idol	Female TV Personality	Nominated	
Teen Choice Awards	2016	Shades of Blue	Choice TV: Drama	Nominated	
Teen Choice Awards	2016	Jennifer Lopez	Choice TV Actress: Drama	Nominated	
Teen Choice Awards	2018	"Dinero" (featuring DJ Khaled and Cardi B)	Choice Latin Song	Nominated	
Telehit Awards	2014	"Booty" (featuring Iggy Azalea)	El Glúteo de Oro	Nominated	
The Record of the Year	1999	"If You Had My Love"	The Record of the Year	10th place	
The Record of the Year	2011	"On the Floor" (featuring Pitbull)	The Record of the Year	9th place	
Top of the Pops Awards	2001	Jennifer Lopez	Artist on Top of the World	Won	
Top of the Pops Awards	2003	Jennifer Lopez	Most Crap Hair	Nominated	
TMF Awards	2001	Jennifer Lopez	Best Zangeres (Best Singer)	Won	
TMF Awards	2002	Jennifer Lopez	Best Zangeres (Best Singer)	Won	
TMF Awards	2002	J.Lo	Best Album	Nominated	
TMF Awards	2003	Jennifer Lopez	Best Female Artist International	Nominated	
TRL Awards	2003	Jennifer Lopez	The First Lady Award (Favorite Female)	Nominated	
TRL Awards	2003	"Play" (TRL Super Bowl XXXV in Tampa)	The Rock The Mic Award (Best Live Performance)	Nominated	
UNESCO Award	2012	Lopez Family Foundation	Award for Philanthropic Work	Won	
Urban Fashion Awards	2002	Jennifer Lopez	Female Urban Fashion Aficionado	Nominated	
Urban Fashion Awards	2002	J.Lo by Jennifer Lopez	New Urban Fashion Celebrity Line	Nominated	
Urban Fashion Awards	2002	J.Lo by Jennifer Lopez	New Designer of the Year	Won	
Us Weekly Awards	2007	Jennifer Lopez	Style Icon of the Year	Won	
Us Weekly Awards	2010	Jennifer Lopez	Style Icon of the Decade	Won	
Vancouver Film Critics Circle Awards	2019	Hustlers	Best Supporting Actress	Nominated	
Variety Awards	2014	Lopez Family Foundation	Power of Women Award	Won	
VH1/Vogue Fashion Awards	1998	Jennifer Lopez	Best Personal Female Style	Nominated	
VH1/Vogue Fashion Awards	1999	Jennifer Lopez	Most Fashionable Female Artist	Won	
VH1/Vogue Fashion Awards	2000	Jennifer Lopez	Versace Award	Won	
VH1/Vogue Fashion Awards	2000	Jennifer Lopez	Most Fashionable Female Artist	Nominated	
VH1/Vogue Fashion Awards	2002	Jennifer Lopez	Most Influential Artist	Won	
Vibe Awards	2003	Jennifer Lopez	Enterprising Entrepreneur	Nominated	
VIVA Comet Awards	2001	Jennifer Lopez	Best International Artist	Nominated	
VIVA Comet Awards	2002	"I'm Real"	Video International	Nominated	
Virgin Media Music Awards	2012	"I'm Into You" (featuring Lil Wayne)	Best Collaboration	Nominated	
Washington D.C. Area Film Critics Association Awards	2019	Hustlers	Best Supporting Actress	Won	
Women Film Critics Circle Awards	2019	Hustlers (with Constance Wu)	Best Screen Couple	Runner-up	
Women in Entertainment Awards (Note: These awards are administered by The Hollywood Reporter.)	2025	Jennifer Lopez	Equity in Entertainment Award	Recipient	
Women in Film Crystal + Lucy Awards	2006	Jennifer Lopez	Crystal Award	Won	
World Music Awards	2002	Jennifer Lopez	World's Best-Selling Latin Female Artist	Won	
World Music Awards	2005	Jennifer Lopez	World's Best-Selling Pop Female Artist	Nominated	
World Music Awards	2007	Jennifer Lopez	World's Best-Selling Latin Female Artist	Nominated	
World Music Awards	2010	Jennifer Lopez	Legend Award	Won	
World Music Awards	2014	Jennifer Lopez	World's Best Female Artist	Nominated	
World Music Awards	2014	Jennifer Lopez	World's Best Live Act	Nominated	
World Music Awards	2014	Jennifer Lopez	World's Best Entertainer of the Year	Nominated	
World Music Awards	2014	"I Luh Ya Papi" (featuring French Montana)	World's Best Song	Nominated	
World Music Awards	2014	"I Luh Ya Papi" (featuring French Montana)	World's Best Video	Nominated	
World Music Awards	2014	"Live It Up" (featuring Pitbull)	World's Best Song	Nominated	
World Music Awards	2014	"Live It Up" (featuring Pitbull)	World's Best Video	Nominated	
WSJ Innovator Awards	2020	Jennifer Lopez	Pop Culture Innovator of the Year	Won	
Your World Awards	2012	"Follow the Leader" (with Wisin & Yandel)	Best Musical Video	Won	
Your World Awards	2012	Jennifer Lopez	Favorite Latino in Hollywood	Won	
Your World Awards	2014	"Adrenalina" (with Wisin and Ricky Martin)	Most Popular Song of the Year	Nominated	
Z Awards	2011	Jennifer Lopez and Marc Anthony	Biggest Celeb Breakup	Won	
