= J.Lo by Jennifer Lopez =

American lifestyle brand

- Type: Corporation
- Industry: Lancaster Group (Coty)
- Founded: 2001
- Founder: Jennifer Lopez
- Headquarters: United States
- Area served: Worldwide
- Key people: Jennifer Lopez; Tommy Hilfiger; Benny Medina
- Products: Consumer goods
- Divisions: Glow by J.Lo

J.Lo by Jennifer Lopez is an American lifestyle brand founded by Jennifer Lopez. Since the release of her debut fragrance Glow in 2001, the line expanded to include clothing, watches, accessories, bedding and perfume, becoming a huge success in the United States and international markets.

== History ==
=== Conception and launch ===
On April 2, 2001, it was announced that Lopez would be launching a clothing line, entitled J.Lo by Jennifer Lopez, in time for the holiday season. The line, which would eventually also include eyewear, swimwear, accessories and a fragrance, was to be backed up by an investment group led by Andy Hilfiger and Larry Stemerman. During the conference, Lopez was quoted as saying that: "it's time for the world to wear my look."

Lopez told reporters that designing clothing was a childhood dream come true, "Even before i learned to dance and sing and act in films, i was just redesigning clothes. I found that there was not exactly what I needed that fit me at the time [...] From the time I was little I would get a whacked pair of pants, really cheap, cut them up and make a beautiful tiny mini skirt out of them because I was on a lower budget at the time [...] I'd get just a plain sweatshirt and I'd make suspenders out of it by (cutting) off the sleeves, or I'd get a little pair of my pants for my birthday and I'd open them up, sew them together, cut them off, and I'd have a really cute little pink mini skirt, or something. I'd rip off the Smurf pockets." Lopez made clear a main incentive for her fashion line, to fit women who had issues like her finding the right clothes "I find it is difficult for women who are curvaceous to find clothes in stores that fit. The voluptuous woman is almost ignored. I want to offer clothes that are wonderfully designed and will fit women of all sizes. Everybody gets to be sexy."

Lopez officially announced and launched a lifestyle brand as "J.Lo by Jennifer Lopez" in April 2001; she introduced it as not only a fashion line, but as something that would also include many different types of clothing for young and older women, including swimwear, fragrances, eyewear, jewelry, hats, gloves, and scarves, outerwear, handbags, lingerie, bed sheets, decorative pillows, watches and footwear.

=== Sweetface Fashion ===
Sweetface Fashion, an organization owned by Andy Hilfiger, primarily owns J.Lo by Jennifer Lopez's fashion line (however does not have connection to its fragrances). Denise Seegal, the president of the Sweetface Company, said of the company "Our goal as a lifestyle brand is to dress our consumers from head-to-toe with products inspired by Jennifer, and lingerie will be an integral part of the J. Lo look." In 2003, Sweetface Fashion which owns the J.Lo By Jennifer Lopez line was bought out by Tommy Hilfiger, Andy Hilfiger's brother, and Lopez's partner in Sweetface Fashion.

In 2007, it was announced that Lopez would drop the J.Lo by Jennifer Lopez brand and begin selling a new line in the United States, "JustSweet", using the same company as the one she used for the J.Lo line. "JustSweet" was put to rest, and later confirmed closed down.

=== Products ===
The line was described by Lopez as affordable, with prices ranging from $20 for smaller items to over $800.

The garments from the line are a reminiscent of what the public has seen Lopez wear previously, including her outfits in movies and music videos; however did not include pieces like her highly publicized "out of this world" Green Versace Dress. Lopez said she hoped the line would appeal to adults and teens. A swimsuit collection was made available, designed by Lopez herself. In 2003, Lopez signed a deal with the Warnaco Group to manufacture and sell a new lingerie collection including underwear, lounge-wear and sleepwear; Joe Gromek, the president and chief executive officer of the Warnaco Group stated ""Jennifer's femininity and signature style have made her a fashion icon and we are confident that JLO Lingerie will bring some new excitement to intimate apparel." The J.Lo by Jennifer Lopez line spawned another minor line, a sportswear line for Girls, "The J.Lo Girls Collection". It was inspired by Lopez's fashion and made into sporting clothes such as key pieces novelty tops, shorts, skirts and bottoms, denim sportswear jackets and jeans.

== Glow for Women ==
In March 2002, it was announced that J.Lo by Jennifer Lopez (Sweetface) was to go in business with the Lancaster Group (a division of Coty to create a fragrance/make up line to be endorsed by Lopez, to be a part of the J.Lo line. On the partnership, a Lancaster representative said "The products will be designed to reflect the inspirational, confident and desirable qualities of Jennifer Lopez herself." Lopez said that the cosmetics line will reflect the brand, "I think people will find that this fragrance embodies the J.Lo brand's spirit, character, energy—it is a true reflection of the modern, independent, yet passionate woman," Lopez said in a statement." Glow for Women was launched in August 2002, as one of the most hyped launches of the year.

In late 2002, her debut fragrance, Glow by J.Lo was released, and brought in $40 million internationally in just the space of the remaining months of 2002. The fragrance briefly faced a lawsuit with Glow Industries, which was ruled in Lopez & Coty, Inc.'s favor. The fragrance has led a handful of flankers. As of 2016, Jennifer Lopez released 26 fragrances.

== List of fragrances ==
Name	Target sex	Year of release	Label	Source
Glow by JLo	Women	2002	Coty, Inc.	
Still Jennifer Lopez	Women	2003	Coty, Inc.	
Miami Glow	Women	2005	Coty, Inc.	
Love at First Glow	Women	2005	Coty, Inc.	
Live Jennifer Lopez	Women	2005	Coty, Inc.	
Glow After Dark	Women	2006	Coty, Inc.	
Live Luxe	Women	2006	Coty, Inc.	
Glow by J.Lo Shimmer Limited Edition	Women	2007	Coty, Inc.	
Glow After Dark by J.Lo Shimmer Limited Edition	Women	2007	Coty, Inc.	
Deseo	Women	2008	Coty, Inc.	
Deseo for Men	Men	2008	Coty, Inc.	
Deseo Forever	Women	2008	Coty, Inc.	
Live Platinum	Women	2008	Coty, Inc.	
Sunkissed Glow	Women	2009	Coty, Inc.	
My Glow	Women	2009	Coty, Inc.	
Blue Glow	Women	2010	Coty, Inc.	
Love and Glamour	Women	2010	Coty, Inc.	
L.A. Glow	Women	2011	Coty, Inc.	
Love & Light	Women	2011	Coty, Inc.	
Glowing by JLo	Women	2012	Coty, Inc.	
Eau de Glow	Women	2012	Coty, Inc.	
Forever Glowing	Women	2013	Coty, Inc.	
Rio Glow	Women	2013	Coty, Inc.	
JLove	Women	2013	Coty, Inc.	
Glowing Goddess	Women	2014	Coty, Inc.	
Wild Glow	Women	2014	Coty, Inc.	
JLuxe	Women	2015	Coty, Inc.	
JLust	Women	2016	Coty, Inc.	
Enduring Glow	Women	2018	Coty, Inc.	
Promise	Women	2019	Coty, Inc.	

== Impact ==
A year after the line's official launch by 2003, Lopez had already sold $175M worth of products in the U.S. Jeffrey Peterson, Quepasa Chairman and Founder said "In a similar way to how Quepasa pioneered the Hispanic Internet on a national level in the United States during the late '90s, Jennifer Lopez started the trend of celebrity fashion brands in 2001. This is a perfect example of how the strong Quepasa brand can be leveraged in an online product launch to a new audience."

== Controversy ==
Lopez's frequent use of animal fur in her clothing lines has brought the scorn of people concerned with animal rights. At the Los Angeles premiere of Monster-in-Law, more than 100 protesters from People for the Ethical Treatment of Animals (PETA) held a demonstration to highlight their concerns. Director of marketing, Charlie Ross said "Jennifer Lopez is a great lover of fur. She is always photographed wearing fur and it was a material she loves and wanted to use. Sweetface is a luxury label, and Jennifer wanted her furs. She told me her favourite piece in the collection is a fabulous bleached silver fox coat with strips of the fox stitched onto a chiffon back."
