= Glowing by JLo =

2012 flanker perfume endorsed by Jennifer Lopez

Fragrance by Jennifer Lopez
- Notes: Bergamot, mandarin, cypress, sandalwood, vanilla, cashmere musk
- Released: May 10, 2012
- Label: Coty, Inc.
- Tagline: New illuminating fragrance bottle
- Predecessor: Love and Light

Glowing by JLo is a women's fragrance endorsed by American entertainer Jennifer Lopez. It was created by Givaudan's Calice Becker and Caroline Sabas. It was released through Coty on May 10, 2012. It was released ten years after her initial fragrance, Glow by JLo (2002) and was also in turn her tenth anniversary with Coty. Prior to its release, Lopez called it a homage and the "evolution of Glow". The bottle was noted for lighting up when in use and Lopez has promoted the fragrance through her music video for "Dance Again".

== Development ==
During an interview with Women's Wear Daily, Lopez stated that Glowing is the "evolution" of her first fragrance, Glow by JLo (2002), and that it is also a homage to it. This fragrance also marked her tenth anniversary since she began endorsing perfumes.

== Packaging and scent ==
Glowing is a floral woody amber that has notes of: bergamot, mandarin, cypress, sandalwood, vanilla, cashmere musk, among other "tantalizing" oils. According to Lopez's parfum and beauty website and basenotes.net, it is inspired by her favorite candle. Lopez explained that the liquid is slightly lavender because it contains a trace of violet.

The bottle for Glowing contains an LED light that illuminates its crystal cylinder for 15 seconds after misting. Speaking of the bottle, Catherine Walsh, Coty's senior vice president stated: "After 10 years, we had to break all the boundaries". Lopez talked about the bottle, stating: "I drove them a little bit crazy with this one. I always feel pressure to create a great fragrance — I always want it to be so special, this one especially because of Glow. We want it to be great, and I think it is." Further speaking about the actual scent, Lopez stated:

"This is a very woodsy scent. So it's not exactly what I created 10 years ago, it's the evolution of that. At the essence, it's still natural, earthy, clean and real, but a little different side of that. It's the woodsy side of it, which I think is kind of New York-y, darker and sexier."

== Promotion and release ==
On February 3, 2012, a promotional poster for Glowing was released. It featured Lopez posing naked in a ring, which Beth Hardie of Daily Mirror said: "also looks like quite oily too, but as the perfume’s not called Slippery, we’ll stick with the radiant aspect." A writer from The Real Style Network online commented: "Fans of Jennifer Lopez are buzzing about the entertainer’s latest ads for her new fragrance ‘Glowing’. In the sexy ads, Lopez poses naked with her arms strategically placed to preserve her modesty." Michelle Manetti of the Huffington Post said the ring looked like a "glowing orb ring".

Lopez utilized her music video for her song "Dance Again" as a form of promotion for the fragrance. The video ends with a shot of the fragrance, and it is implied that the entire clip was set inside the bottle. The video was uploaded to Lopez's VEVO channel on April 5, 2012, after a sneak peek aired the same day on the television show American Idol, where Lopez is a judge. Initially, it was sold exclusively just to Kohl's Department Stores. The official launch of the perfume and launch event was on May 10, 2012 at Hotel Bel Air in Los Angeles. It was also celebrating 10 years of partnership between Lopez and Coty, Inc. releasing beauty products. An advertisement for the fragrance has aired, and is available on Lopez's fashion YouTube account.

== Reception ==
In their first fragrance review, Cheryl Johnson, of the website Future Derm, reviewed Glowing. Johnson stated that "the bottle itself is nice: it feels luxe, with the exception of the top, which feels a bit inexpensive in comparison to the rest of the bottle". However, Johnson described the glow of the bottle when you spray it as "gimmicky". She further described the scent as "very strong floral and powdery, but quickly dries down to a fresh clean scent. I am reminded of a walk in the springtime, with the scent of fresh cut grass and flowers beginning to bloom. It is very feminine, most definitely not a unisex fragrance at all."

== Products ==
List of Glowing by JLo products:

- 75ml / 2.5 fl oz
- 50ml / 1.7 fl oz
- 30ml / 1.0 fl oz
- 200ml / 6.7 fl oz Body Lotion
