= Hilfiger (disambiguation) =

Tommy Hilfiger is an American fashion designer.

Hilfiger may also refer to:

- Andy Hilfiger, American businessman and musician
- Billy Hilfiger, American musician

== See also ==
- Zay Hilfigerrr, American rapper
