= Love and Glamour =

2010 perfume endorsed by Jennifer Lopez

Fragrance by Jennifer Lopez
- Top notes: Italian mandarin; guava; peach flesh
- Heart notes: Coconut; orange blossom; jasmine petals
- Base notes: Sandalwood; musk; amber
- Released: September 2010
- Label: Coty, Inc.
- Tagline: Lights * Camera * Passion
- Flanker(s): Love and Light

Love and Glamour is a women's eau de toilette fragrance endorsed by American entertainer Jennifer Lopez.

== Background and conception ==
Lopez released her first signature perfume, Glow by JLo, in 2002; it went on to become the second-highest-selling fragrance in the United States. With this, she became a pioneer for the celebrity endorsement of perfume, and influenced various other celebrities to follow the trend. By the time of Love and Glamour's release in October 2010, Lopez's fragrances had taken in over $1 billion worldwide.

In an interview with Women's Wear Daily, Lopez explained the inspiration behind the perfume:

What I always like to do is look at where I am in my life at the moment. [Here] it was right after the babies and was when I was getting back to work and getting back to what I do again. It just felt like a time of a lot of love and that seemed very romantic to me — I said it seems like love and glamour.

== Development ==
Lopez worked side by side with Coty, Inc. to create the signature fragrance blend of Love and Glamour, and was heavily involved in the creation process.

I drive [Coty] a little bit crazy, because it's always not signature enough. I go back and say things like, 'Can we push the sandalwood a little bit more, can we make a tiny bit more sexy?' To translate that into actual chemistry is a difficult thing. Then they go back and say, 'What does she mean by sexy?' And I'm like, 'You know if you [take] that little piece that smells a little bit like wood but has a little bit of musk? But I just want you to add a little bit of sweetness. Can you do that for me?' And then I think we are in the right direction. And then they come with one or two variations and I say, 'No, that's not it.' It's a long process.

According to Lopez, creating the scent was the most difficult part of the process, as compared to putting together the packaging and the marketing campaign.

== Scent and bottle ==
Love and Glamour has top notes of Italian mandarin, guava and peach flesh; heart notes of coconut, orange blossom and jasmine petals; and base notes of sandalwood, musk and amber. Lopez hoped to create "a combination that people have never smelled before".

Love and Glamour's bottle was designed by Lopez with the aid of designer Jon DiNapoli. It is shaped to resemble "a woman wearing an elegant gown", and was described by Alessandra Greco of Vogue as curvy, sexy and seductive.

== Marketing and reception ==
Love and Glamour made its debut at a Macy's department store in New York City on September 11, 2010. A promotional website was launched that allowed online viewers to unlock an exclusive behind-the-scenes film noir style video clip of Lopez. The campaign for the scent was shot by photographer Craig McDean on a movie set, with Lopez's hair and make up styled to match a classic film star.

Seventeen magazine was positive about Love and Glamour, writing: "it's definitely a scent that's going to have everyone asking what you're wearing".

== Products ==
List of Love and Glamour products:

- 50ml Eau de Parfum
- 75ml Eau de Parfum
- 200ml body care lotion

Love and Glamour was also made available in a gift set that included a body lotion and shower gel.

== See also ==
- List of celebrity-branded fragrances
