= Radio Music Awards =

American music award

The Radio Music Awards was an annual U.S. award that honors the year's most successful songs. Originally a televised show recognizing mainstream radio, nominations were based on the amount of airplay recording artists received on radio stations in various formats using chart information compiled by Mediabase. The awards have now expanded to honor both major label and independent recording artists. Works are committee-reviewed based on the artistic and technical merits of the recordings and products submitted.

Originally conceived as an award show vehicle for The WB in 1999, it was moved to ABC in 2000 and finally to NBC, which promoted it as the music industry's answer to the Golden Globes.

In past years, the show included many of the top names in music including NSYNC, Shakira, Backstreet Boys, Green Day, Janet Jackson, Mariah Carey, Train, Elton John, Destiny's Child, Tim McGraw, Kelly Clarkson, Lenny Kravitz, Nelly, Gavin DeGraw, Britney Spears, Avril Lavigne, Lifehouse, and Christina Aguilera, among others.

== Dates, venues, and networks ==
- October 28, 1999: Mandalay Bay Resort & Casino, Las Vegas, Nevada: (The WB)
- November 4, 2000: Aladdin Casino & Resort, Las Vegas, Nevada: (ABC)
- October 26, 2001: Aladdin Casino & Resort, Las Vegas, Nevada: (ABC)
- October 27, 2003: Aladdin Casino & Resort, Las Vegas, Nevada: (NBC)
- October 25, 2004: Aladdin Casino & Resort, Las Vegas, Nevada: (NBC)
- December 19, 2005: Aladdin Casino & Resort, Las Vegas, Nevada: (NBC)

== Winners and Nominees ==
=== 1999 ===
- Alternative Artist of the Year: Smash Mouth
  - Nominees: Red Hot Chili Peppers, Blink-182, Godsmack, Rob Zombie, The Offspring
- Country Artist of the Year: Dixie Chicks & Shania Twain
  - Nominees: Jo Dee Messina, Kenny Chesney, George Strait, Lonestar
- R&B/Hip-Hop Artist of the Year: Lauryn Hill
  - Nominees: 112, Destiny's Child, Ginuwine, Jay-Z, TLC
- Parents Just Don't Understand: Limp Bizkit
  - Nominees: Kid Rock, Marilyn Manson, Korn, Rob Zombie
- Air Personality of the Year: Kidd Kraddick
  - Nominees: The Dog House, Gerry House, Kevin and Bean, MJ Kelli & BJ Harris, Rick Dees, Mancow Muller
- Best Hook-Up Song: Edwin McCain - "I'll Be"
  - Nominees: Mark Chesnutt - "I Don't Want to Miss a Thing", Brandy - "Have You Ever?", Backstreet Boys - "I'll Never Break Your Heart", NSYNC - "(God Must Have Spent) A Little More Time on You"
- Best Car Jam: Jay-Z - "Can I Get A..."
  - Nominees: Lenny Kravitz - "Fly Away", Will Smith, Dru Hill and Kool Moe Dee - "Wild Wild West", 98° - "Because of You", Kenny Chesney - "How Forever Feels"
- Pop Song of the Year: Goo Goo Dolls - "Iris"
  - Nominees: Shawn Mullins - "Lullaby", Barenaked Ladies - "One Week", Sugar Ray - "Every Morning", Sarah McLachlan - "Angel", Britney Spears - "...Baby One More Time"
- Most Stylin' Male: NSYNC
- Most Stylin' Female: Christina Aguilera
- Legend Award: David Bowie

=== 2000 ===
- Artist of the Year (Pop/Alternarive Radio): Goo Goo Dolls
  - Nominees: Sugar Ray, Third Eye Blind, Santana, Smash Mouth
- Artist of the Year (Hip Hop/Rhythmic Radio): Jay-Z
  - Nominees: Destiny's Child, Sisqó, Aaliyah, Joe
- Artist of the Year (Top 40 Pop Radio): NSYNC
  - Nominees: Backstreet Boys, Christina Aguilera, Britney Spears, Santana
- Most Requested Song: 98° - "Give Me Just One Night (Una Noche)"
  - Nominees: Madonna - "Music", Enrique Iglesias - "Be with You", Everclear - "Wonderful", Jo Dee Messina - "That's the Way"
- Most Requested Slow Dance Song: Backstreet Boys - "Show Me the Meaning of Being Lonely"
  - Nominees: Creed - "With Arms Wide Open", NSYNC - "This I Promise You"
- Most Requested Artist: Ricky Martin
- Legend Award: Dr. Dre

=== 2001 ===
- Artist of the Year (Alternative/Active Rock):
  - Nominees: Godsmack, Stone Temple Pilots, Staind, Linkin Park, Limp Bizkit
- Artist of the Year (Top 40/Pop): Destiny's Child
  - Nominees: Nelly, Jennifer Lopez, Matchbox Twenty, Shaggy
- Artist of the Year (Country): Tim McGraw
  - Nominees: Dixie Chicks, Brooks & Dunn, George Strait, Alan Jackson
- Artist of the Year (Pop Alternative): Lenny Kravitz
  - Nominees: Matchbox Twenty, Madonna, Dido, U2
- Artist of the Year (Hip Hop/Rhythmic): Destiny's Child
  - Nominees: Missy Elliott, 112, Ja Rule, Nelly
- Song of the Year (Alternative/Active Rock): Papa Roach - "Last Resort"
  - Nominees: Incubus - "Drive"; Staind - "It's Been Awhile"; Linkin Park - "One Step Closer"; Fuel - "Hemorrhage (In My Hands)"
- Song of the Year (Top 40/Pop): Christina Aguilera, Lil' Kim, Mýa and Pink - "Lady Marmalade"
  - Nominees: Lifehouse - "Hanging by a Moment; O-Town - "All or Nothing"; Shaggy - "Angel"; 3 Doors Down - "Kryptonite"
- Song of the Year (Country):
  - Nominees: Tim McGraw - "My Next Thirty Years"; Brooks & Dunn - "Ain't Nothing 'Bout You"; Travis Tritt - "It's a Great Day to Be Alive"; Jessica Andrews - "Who I Am"; Diamond Rio - "One More Day"
- Song of the Year (Pop Alternative): Lifehouse - "Hanging by a Moment
  - Nominees: Matchbox Twenty - "If You're Gone"; Uncle Kracker - "Follow Me"; Train - "Drops of Jupiter (Tell Me)"; Dido - "Thank You"
- Song of the Year (Hip Hop/Rhythmic):
  - Nominees: Ja Rule, Lil' Mo and Vita - "Put It on Me"; 112 - "Peaches & Cream"; Nelly - "Ride wit Me," Jennifer Lopez - "I'm Real"; Eve and Gwen Stefani - "Let Me Blow Ya Mind"
- Most Requested Artist: Mariah Carey
  - Nominees: Lenny Kravitz, Kid Rock, Snoop Dogg, Sugar Ray
- Most Requested Song: Nelly Furtado - "Turn Off the Light"
  - Nominees: Craig David - "Fill Me In", Jay-Z - "Izzo (H.O.V.A.)", Uncle Kracker - "Follow Me", Backstreet Boys - "Drowning"
- Best Party Song: Eve and Gwen Stefani - "Let Me Blow Ya Mind"
- Legend Award: Elton John
