= Still Jennifer Lopez =

Fragrance

Fragrance by Jennifer Lopez
- Notes: Sake, mandarin, earl grey, pink freesia, honeysuckle, orange flower, sandalwood, amber, orris
- Released: September 14, 2003; 23 years ago
- Label: Coty, Inc.
- Tagline: Sheer-Captivating-Real
- Predecessor: Glow by JLo
- Successor: Miami Glow by JLo

Still Jennifer Lopez is a women's fragrance endorsed by American entertainer Jennifer Lopez, released by Coty, Inc. in September 2003. The fragrance contains notes of sake, mandarin, earl grey, pink freesia, honeysuckle, orange flower, sandalwood, amber and orris. Still Jennifer Lopez followed in the footsteps of Glow by JLo, an international success that shaped the fragrance industry and began a trend in the celebrity endorsement of fragrance. The release of Still Jennifer Lopez was not anticipated due to the negative publicity generated from Lopez's film Gigli (2003) and a fall-out with her manager Benny Medina. Several fragrance industry experts noted that it could ruin the success of Glow by JLo. It was also noted that her public image at the time would have irreparable effects on the fragrance's performance.

The promotion of Still Jennifer Lopez and the scent were met with positive feedback, with many comparing it to her song "Jenny from the Block". The fragrance was aimed at a female demographic above the age of 25, a shift from Glow by JLo, which was aimed at teenagers and females in their early twenties. Its theme is about Lopez still being herself, despite what the media reports. The bottle was a commercial success, collectively bringing in over $300 million with its predecessor Glow by JLo.

== Background and development ==
In October 2002, Lopez released her first signature fragrance Glow by JLo. Among low expectations, the fragrance performed strongly and became the top-selling fragrance in the United States. Glow by JLo's success caused a wave of celebrity endorsement of fragrances. She is often credited with beginning the trend, which other celebrities such as Britney Spears and Beyoncé Knowles have followed. In July 2003, it was reported by MTV News that Lopez was to release her second fragrance, which is "directed at a more upscale market" than Glow by JLo. Reaction was mixed; it was initially believed that the release of Still Jennifer Lopez could harm the success of Glow by JLo, which had grossed $40 million in under two months alone.

At the time of the fragrance's release, Lopez's film Gigli which co-starred her then-fiancé, Ben Affleck, was released to negative reviews and bombed at the box office. It was for this reason why many considered the fragrance to be at risk if it failed. Additionally, controversy arose after Lopez fired her manager Benny Medina that summer, causing the public to read more negative publications about Lopez. Design and brand strategist Kathy Feakins stated: "The easy way to view this is to witness what happened to Martha Stewart", further opining: "Once someone is strongly associated with a product or service, what happens to their image can have an impact on the product."

"This is the second step of building the Jennifer Lopez beauty house. She's not a one-shot deal."

— Michele Scannavini, Coty's fragrance division president, on the fragrance (2003)

Lancaster, however, kept an eye on the public scrutiny surrounding Lopez. Olivier Van Doorne, worldwide creative director at Select Communications, said: "Whenever you take a celebrity into a commercial venture, which more and more people are doing, there's enormous risk [...] It doesn't take much to turn the public around overnight." Mark Malinowski, director for entertainment marketing at Ketchum, part of the Omnicom, said the situation "will reach a point where, like anything else, there may be overexposure". Lancaster's marketing vice president Catherine Walsh remarked in a statement: "The worst thing in the world would be to unplug Glow to introduce Still". Still Jennifer Lopez launched at Robinsons-May department stores on September 14, 2003, followed by Macy's Herald Square on September 21. It was released nationwide the following month. While Glow by JLo was aimed at the female market at girls between the age of 15 and 25, Still Jennifer Lopez was aimed to appeal to an older demographic of females 25 and above, according to Rebecca Murray of About.com.

The president of Coty's fragrance division, Michele Scannavini, stated that Lopez, who worked at a department store as a teenager, "has a very good nose". Scannavini also noted that Lopez was "involved in every step of the perfume's development". In a press release issued to announce Still Jennifer Lopez, Lopez made the following statement: "It means no matter what happens, I am 'still' myself. I am 'still' Jennifer Lopez. But it also means that the game's not over yet. I am 'still' growing and 'still' working to do the best I can."

== Packaging and scent ==
According to Lopez's parfum and beauty website, Still Jennifer Lopez "is the scent of a woman. A scent that captures the way a woman feels when she has discovered herself." The fragrance is split into three sections of notes, "Sheer", "Captivating" and "Real". Its top note is sake, while also containing mandarine, earl grey, pink freesia, honeysuckle, orange flower, sandalwood, amber and orris. Michele Scannavini stated that the scent's "unusual" top note of sake was Lopez's idea. The bottle is shimmering and personalized with a removable complimentary diamond faux ring at its neck, which was included because of Lopez's love for jewelry.

As of 2020 the package was redesigned and no longer has faux ring.

== Release ==
=== Promotion ===
The advertisement for Still Jennifer Lopez features Lopez in a vintage gown. The perfume's slogan is: "In the eye of the storm, I am still Jennifer Lopez." In the television advert, she appears in a more "mature theme", wearing an elegant dress while posing, in comparison to the promotional ad for Glow by JLo, which had her nude and behind glass. The slogan represented that while there was a media storm surrounding her highly publicized personal life, she was still herself. Lopez's promotional ads occupied space in magazines such as People, Harper's Bazaar Vanity Fair and Time among several other publications. The campaign also expanded to radio.

=== Response ===
The fragrance is described by Steal Their Style as a "feminine and flowery fragrance". Along with Glow by JLo, the perfume achieved success in the fragrance market and became one of America's highest-selling bottles. Collectively with Glow by JLo, it brought in over $USD300 million within a year, making Lopez the nineteenth richest person under forty, according to business magazine Forbes. The Fragrance Foundation's FiFi Awards named it the "Celebrity Fragrance of the Year" in June 2003. Several writers compared the theme of Still Jennifer Lopez's promotional campaign to her hit-song "Jenny from the Block" (2002), in which she declared "I'm Still, I'm Still Jenny from the Block / Used to have a little now I have a lot / No matter where I go, I know where I came from." Speaking about the fragrance's slogan, The New York Times wrote that it is "a line that refers partly to her composure under the media glare but also serves as a pitch to potential consumers [...] It also evokes a song from her latest album, Jenny from the Block, in which she declares that despite fame, she is essentially her old self from South Bronx."

== Products ==
The products for Still Jennifer Lopez:

- Eau de Parfum Spray 3.4 fl oz / 100 ml
- Eau de Parfum Spray 1.0 fl oz / 30 ml
- Eau de Parfum Spray 1.7 fl oz / 50 ml
- Shower Gel 6.7 fl oz / 200 ml
- Body lotion 6.7 fl oz / 200 ml

== See also ==
- List of celebrity-branded fragrances
