= Andy Hilfiger =

- Origin: Elmira, New York, United States
- Genres: Classic rock
- Years active: 1970s to Present
- Label: Andy Hilfiger Entertainment
- Website: Official website

Andrew Charles Hilfiger is an American businessman in the fashion industry and a musician. He is the creative director and namesake of Andrew Charles, a rock 'n' roll inspired fashion line, of which Steven Tyler is the face.

Hilfiger's first job was at 12 years when he began selling jeans in his brother Tommy Hilfiger's store. Hilfiger's other love is music and he has been playing bass guitar since he was a teen. In 1982, Hilfiger moved to Manhattan from upstate New York where he began to further pursue music. Andy toured with members of the Ramones, Kid Rock, and Blue Öyster Cult.

In the 1990s, Hilfiger started a division at Tommy Hilfiger USA, Inc. styling and dressing some of Hollywood's movie stars and rock and pop musicians and sponsoring concert tours. Hilfiger also started the accessories division for Tommy Hilfiger USA, Inc., where he designed hats, bags, and outerwear, creating a multimillion-dollar business.

After a decade of work at Tommy Hilfiger, Hilfiger started a new company called Sweet Face Fashion where Hilfiger played a major role in launching the JLO by Jennifer Lopez brand. Hilfiger eventually helped to build the company to gross $250 million in sales and launched the fragrance Glow by J.Lo. Currently, Hilfiger is a partner in Star Branding, along with Tommy Hilfiger, Bernt Ullmann, and Joe Lamastra. Star Branding is a partner with Li & Fung USA in a company called MESH, under which the Andrew Charles fashion line was developed.

Andrew Charles launched in the Impulse department of select Macy's stores and on macys.com in Fall 2011. It consists of a menswear line, inspired by Steven Tyler, and a women's collection inspired by 1970s bohemian styles. Steven Tyler and his daughter, Chelsea Tyler, are the faces of the Andrew Charles advertising campaign and have made appearances at select Macy's stores to promote the brand. Hilfiger has also developed a line of scarves with Steven Tyler for Andrew Charles called Rock Scarf.

During the 1980s, Hilfiger played bass guitar in the band King Flux, which consisted of his brother Billy Hilfiger, Richie Stotts of the Plasmatics, and Marky Ramone. Other lineups for this band included Tony Petri from Twisted Sister and Albert Bouchard of Blue Öyster Cult. Hilfiger currently plays bass for the X Brothers along with Joe Bouchard of Blue Öyster Cult. The X Brothers have released two albums to date and are currently recording their third.
