= 2003 Radio Music Awards =

2003
- Date: October 27, 2003
- Location: Aladdin Casino & Resort, Las Vegas, Nevada
- Hosted by: Ryan Seacrest; Brooke Burns

Television/radio coverage
- Network: NBC
- Runtime: 100 minutes
- Produced by: Clear Channel Radio; Tall Pony Productions
- Directed by: Margo Romero

The 2003 Radio Music Awards was held on October 27, 2003, at the Aladdin Casino & Resort, in Las Vegas, Nevada. The ceremony was broadcast by NBC, and it was hosted by Ryan Seacrest and Brooke Burns.

== Performances ==
| Performer(s) | Song(s) | Introduced by |
|---|---|---|
| Beyoncé | "Baby Boy" | Justin Timberlake |
| Kelly Clarkson | "Low" | Ryan Seacrest |
| P. Diddy; Nelly; Murphy Lee | "Shake Ya Tailfeather" | Ryan Seacrest |
| Avril Lavigne | "Knockin' on Heaven's Door" | Brooke Burns |
| Tim McGraw | "Real Good Man | Brooke Burns |
| Michael Jackson; The All Stars | "What More Can I Give" (music video) | Michael Jackson |
| Michelle Branch | "Breathe" | Ryan Seacrest; Brooke Burns |
| Jewel | "Stand" | Brooke Burns |
| Tom Petty and the Heartbreakers | "Runnin' Down a Dream" | Ryan Seacrest |
| Tom Petty and the Heartbreakers | "I'm Crying" | Ryan Seacrest; Brooke Burns |

== Winners and nominees ==
The nominees in each category were based on radio’s top-playing songs. Radio program and music directors nationwide voted on the winners.

| Artist of the Year: Country Radio (presented by Justin Timberlake) | Artist of the Year: Top 40 Radio (presented by Carson Daly) |
|---|---|
| Tim McGraw; Alan Jackson; George Strait; Toby Keith; Kenny Chesney | Justin Timberlake; Jennifer Lopez; Christina Aguilera; Eminem; Avril Lavigne |
| Best Driving Song (presented by Lonestar and Juliette Lewis) | Song of the Year: Modern Adult Contemporary Radio (presented by Uncle Kracker and Maria Bello) |
| "Shake Ya Tailfeather" – Nelly, P. Diddy and Murphy Lee; "The Game of Love" – Santana feat. Michelle Branch; "Drift Away" – Uncle Kracker feat. Dobie Gray; "Miss Independent" – Kelly Clarkson; "Crazy in Love" – Beyoncé feat. Jay-Z | "Complicated" – Avril Lavigne; "Unwell" - Matchbox Twenty; "The Game of Love" – Santana feat. Michelle Branch; "I'm with You" – Avril Lavigne; "Calling All Angels" - Train |
| Best Hook-Up Song (presented by Molly Sims and Nick Lachey) | Artist of the Year: Hip-Hop Radio (presented by Pharrell Williams, Mark McGrath and Monica) |
| "Intuition" – Jewel; "Your Body Is a Wonderland" – John Mayer; "Baby I Love U!" – Jennifer Lopez; "Beautiful" – Christina Aguilera; "Picture" – Kid Rock feat. Sheryl Crow | 50 Cent; Missy Elliott; Eminem; Nelly; Jennifer Lopez |
| Artist of the Year: Modern Adult Contemporary Radio (presented by Parminder Nagra and Liz Phair) | Humanitarian Award (presented by Beyoncé) |
| John Mayer; No Doubt; Matchbox Twenty; Uncle Kracker; Avril Lavigne | Michael Jackson |
| Icon Award (presented by JC Chasez) | Legend Award (presented by Stevie Nicks) |
| Casey Kasem | Tom Petty |
