= Dance Again =

Single by Jennifer Lopez featuring Pitbull

from the album Dance Again... the Hits
- Released: April 2, 2012
- Recorded: 2011
- Studio: Henson (Los Angeles); Pinky's Place (Hidden Hills); Al Burna Studios (Miami)
- Genre: Dance-pop; electropop; Eurodance
- Length: 4:00
- Label: Epic
- Songwriters: Nadir Khayat; Enrique Iglesias; Bilal Hajji; Achraf Jannusi; Armando Perez
- Producers: RedOne; Kuk Harrell

Jennifer Lopez singles chronology
"T.H.E. (The Hardest Ever)" (2011)	"Dance Again" (2012)	"Follow the Leader" (2012)

Pitbull singles chronology
"Back in Time" (2012)	"Dance Again" (2012)	"I'm All Yours" (2012)

Music video
- "Dance Again" on YouTube

"Dance Again" is a song recorded by American singer Jennifer Lopez for her first greatest hits album, Dance Again... the Hits (2012). It features guest vocals from American rapper Pitbull. The song was written by Enrique Iglesias, Bilal "The Chef" Hajji, AJ Junior, Pitbull and RedOne, who also produced the song. At the time of the song's production, Lopez was unsure whether or not the song would be the lead single from a greatest hits album, or a new studio album.

"Dance Again", an uptempo dance-pop and electropop song, features Lopez singing about wanting to dance and love, and it contains several sexual innuendos. Lopez credits the song as her anthem and metaphor, which stood for her surviving a rough divorce. It marks the third collaboration between Lopez and Pitbull following "Fresh Out the Oven" (2009) and the 2011 single "On the Floor". Following its release, "Dance Again" went number one in Greece, South Korea, the US Billboard Dance Club Songs chart, and the Billboard Global Dance Tracks chart. Elsewhere, the song reached the top ten in sixteen countries.

Critics noted similarities between "Dance Again" and the duo's previous collaboration "On the Floor" but critiqued the former for its lack of originality. An accompanying music video was directed by long-time collaborator Paul Hunter and choreographed by Frank Gatson, Jr.; both the song and the video drew comparisons to the works of Australian singer Kylie Minogue. The video premiered during an episode of American Idol on April 5, 2012, where Lopez was a judge. Her boyfriend of that time Casper Smart appears in the video. Though the clip was welcomed with positive reviews, several critics noted that the video's content wasn't suitable for a premiere on the family-friendly American Idol, with some even criticizing Lopez for debuting the video on the television show. On July 31, 2012, the music video received an MTV Video Music Award nomination for Best Choreography.

== Background ==
After experiencing a decrease in her commercial success with her fifth and sixth studio albums, Como Ama una Mujer and Brave (both 2007) and the single "Louboutins" (2009), Lopez left Epic Records in February 2010, citing that she had fulfilled her contractual obligations and now wished to release her seventh studio album, Love?, under a new label. Her departure from the label temporarily halted production on the album, however upon signing a new contract with Island Records, recording resumed on the album. "On the Floor", her first single with the label, was released in February 2011. The song topped the charts across the globe, becoming one of the most successful singles of the year. Following the release of "On the Floor", Love? produced two moderately successful singles: "I'm Into You" and "Papi", both of which topped the US Billboard Hot Dance Club Songs chart. Love? itself was a moderate commercial success and was viewed as a humble comeback from Lopez, as many had considered her recording career over.

It was announced in November that Lopez was working on new material for her first greatest hits album. The following month, Lopez revealed that she had been playing some of her new music for L.A. Reid, who signed her to Island Records and left the label to become the CEO and chairman of Epic Records. This led further speculation that Lopez had moved back to Epic Records, which was first reported in July. The reports were later confirmed untrue; Lopez was back with Epic Records as she had owed the label one final album to end her contract, despite previously announcing that she had fulfilled her contract with them.

== Writing and production ==
"Dance Again" was written by RedOne, Enrique Iglesias, Bilal "The Chef", AJ Junior and Pitbull. After hearing a demo version of the track, she begged Iglesias to let her record the song, telling him that it was "her song". Lopez, who was going through a divorce with Marc Anthony and the "breakup of a family", felt as if the song had come to her at the "perfect moment". According to Lopez, the period was devastating because family is very important to her. Lopez revealed: "I had to turn that into something better"; she thought: "I don't want to just survive it, I want to come out better than that." Lopez didn't want to be "the woman who stayed in bed for months". "I knew I had to get through it. I'd dance every day, I'd work out, I'd say a little prayer and I still wouldn't feel any better. Then I'd go to bed and get up the next day and do it all again. It was a process, and it very gradually got a little easier ... I had to do it for my kids. I had to get through it for them." She re-wrote parts of the verses to better relate to her experiences. The song "helped lift her out of the darkness" and gave her hope again. Looking back on the song in December 2012, Lopez stated that: "'Dance Again' became my anthem ... an expression of what I needed to do at that time in my life and for what I was taking on with [my career]. It was a beautiful metaphor that became my reality."

Lopez's vocals for "Dance Again" were arranged by RedOne and produced by Kuk Harrell. They were recorded at Pinky's Palace. Pitbull's vocals were recorded by Al Burna at Al Burna Studios, Miami, Florida. Chris "Tek" O'Ryan and Trevor Muzzy handled audio engineering of the song, with assistance from Anthony Falcone and Peter Mack. O'Ryan and Trevor Muzzy were in charge of vocal editing. All instruments in the song were played and programmed by RedOne, who also produced the song. The song was later mixed by Trevor Muzzy. In an interview with Ryan Seacrest, Lopez revealed that she loved being able to collaborate with RedOne and Pitbull again. She stated: "We had a great chemistry the last time, and it was like 'We're going to have to do something again.' And this was the perfect song. I love the message of the song. That when something bad happens, your life is not over. You have to get up. You're gonna live. You're gonna to be okay. You're gonna dance again."

== Release and artwork ==
Lopez announced on March 2, 2012, that she would release a new single by the end of the month. On March 15 it was revealed during an episode of American Idol that the song would be released on March 30. On March 26, a snippet of the song was made available online by WHYI-FM. Two days later, a one-minute snippet of the song appeared online. "Dance Again" made its world premiere on March 30, 2012, during Ryan Seacrest's radio show On-Air with Ryan Seacrest. A lyric video was released on YouTube the same day and the song was officially sent to mainstream radio in the United States on April 3, 2012.

On March 27, Lopez posted a quarter of the single's official artwork through a puzzle piece; if 15,500 people shared the post on Facebook, a new piece of the puzzle (artwork) would be unlocked. The three puzzle pieces were revealed, and Lopez posted the entire artwork on her website on March 29. It featured her entangled with a group of half-naked men, wearing black masks on their eyes, and Lopez wearing a black top with a necklace and stockings. Lopez has stated that she doesn't know if "Dance Again" would be the lead single from a greatest hits album or her eighth studio album. It was later decided to make it the lead single from her greatest hits album, Dance Again... the Hits.

== Composition ==
"Dance Again"
A 24-second sample of the song's chorus, which features Lopez singing the pre-chorus before following to the chorus, where she states, "I wanna dance and love and dance again."

"Dance Again" is an uptempo dance-pop and electropop song, with a length of three minutes and fifty-seven seconds (3:57). It was written by Nadir "RedOne" Khayat, The Chef, Enrique Iglesias, Achraff Janussi and Armando "Pitbull" Perez, who is also featured on the song. During an interview with Ryan Seacrest, Lopez stated that the song was nearly complete when she heard it and that she only changed minor details to keep the message of the song the same. The electro beat begins, and the song kicks off with Pitbull's brief rap introduction. The beat of the song shifts from upbeat pings and claps to a bass backdrop as Lopez takes over the vocals.

The first verse begins with Lopez singing, "Nobody knows what I'm feeling inside. I find it so stupid so why should I hide that I love to make love to you baby." The quick pace electro beat returns, revving up energy before Lopez goes into the chorus, "I wanna dance and love and dance again." Pitbull sings the lyrics "Dance, yes, love, next", and even occupied a rap verse for the song. Sara Gates of The Huffington Post said that the chorus line "will surely get stuck in your head." It has been suggested that the chorus was "cheesy" and weak, and ends up being trumped by the pre-chorus, verses, overall production and fist-pumping beat. The song contains sexual innuendos, and Lopez sings the bridge with heartbreaking emotion. The song has been compared to Lopez's song "Waiting For Tonight". Kyle Anderson from Entertainment Weekly noted that Pitbull's lyrics "Can't even show love 'cause they'll sue ya" was a reference to Lindsay Lohan suing him for using a reference to her without her consent in his song "Give Me Everything" (2011).

== Critical response ==
Music critics have been divided on "Dance Again". Kate Callahan from MTV.com pointed out the similarities between "Dance Again" and "On the Floor"—"The song is a fun dance pop track with a great beat, very much along the lines of their 2011 collaborative effort 'On The Floor'." Callahan said that the formats of the two songs were very alike, but also added that as the title implies, the song is danceable, despite not being her most original song. Katherine St Asaph of Popdust gave the song a mixed review, stating "[without sampling a song] means "Dance Again" doesn't have any of that swoon or allure, let alone one unifying riff, and it means that right before every verse-to-prechorus or prechorus-to-verse transition, you're imagining the "la-lalalala..." chorus that doesn't break out. What breaks out instead is the stately dance-pop that makes up the rest of "On the Floor," more polite than pressing even when it's even clearer that the metaphor here is dancing-as-sex."

Glen Gamboa of Newsday gave the song a negative review, commenting that "She holds back for much of the song, with its airy chorus and moments where it seems ready to launch into a much broader anthem, but instead stays on a sleek, unpredictable line. Would it be better if it blossomed into "Waiting for Tonight" like it wants to? Maybe." Kyle Anderson from Entertainment Weekly gave the song a positive review, writing "Lopez once again sings over a buttery disco groove with an assist from Miami's favorite bilingual MC." Anderson noted that the chorus of the song is "as pure a piece of effervescent pop as Lopez has ever been a part of, and while it probably isn't the sort of thing meant to be listened to on headphones in a cubicle, it should play pretty well in places where grinding is encouraged (like clubs in Ibiza, and middle school dances)."

Melinda Newman of Hitfix was positive in her review, saying that the song "It lives up to its title: You'll want to put on your dancing shoes and dance again. The song isn't as interesting musically as the pair's previous hit collaboration, "On the Floor" but it is more consistent in its commitment to being a full-on dance twirler ... It's totally charming, especially the "woo..ooh" background singing." Newman compared the chorus of the song to Rihanna's "Only Girl (In the World)" (2010). Gina Serpe of E! News said "don't think for a minute that the meaning behind the song was lost on Lopez, who's been through some personal travails of her own this past year," and briefly commented that the song was "Likely already destined to hit the top of the charts." Similarly, Jessica Sinclair of Long Island Press commented that the song was a "sure-to-be-hit song." Amy Sciarretto of Pop Crush labelled "Dance Again" as one of the best dance songs of 2012. She stated that: "The song has an infectious beat that'll get you moving and grooving."

== Commercial performance ==
In the United States, "Dance Again" experienced moderate chart success; while an improvement on her previous singles from Love?, "I'm Into You" and "Papi", it failed to match the success of "On the Floor". For the week ending April 2, 2012, it debuted on Billboard's Pop Songs chart at number 34, and ultimately peaked at 17. In its official first week of availability, the song sold 118,000 digital copies following the release of its accompanying music video, launching at number 27 on the Billboard Hot 100, her third highest debut on the chart after "All I Have" which debuted at 25 in 2002 and "On the Floor" which debuted at nine in 2011. "Dance Again" also debuted at number 14 on Billboard's Hot Digital Songs chart following its release. In its second week, it fell seven slots on the Hot 100 to number 34 with 85,000 digital copies sold. The following week it climbed to 29 with sales of 74,000 digital copies. Its fourth week saw sales of 76,000, allowing it to reach a new peak of number 25. Following her performance of the song on American Idol, it sold an additional 104,000 digital copies which brought "Dance Again" to its peak position of number 17. However, airplay for the song began to fall. "Dance Again" managed to reach a peak of nine on the Hot Digital Songs chart. It entered the Billboard Hot Dance Club Songs Chart at number 56, and went on to peak at number one, becoming her twelfth number one there. In September 2012, "Dance Again" received a platinum certification by the Recording Industry Association of America for sales of over one million. As of April 25, 2013, "Dance Again" has sold 1.2 million copies in the United States.

"Dance Again" performed moderately outside of the United States. The song debuted at number 13 on the Canadian Hot 100, winning the "hot shot" debut of the week, remaining at the same position the following week. The song has since peaked at number four, becoming her tenth top-ten hit there. In the United Kingdom, "Dance Again" made its debut at number 11 on the UK Singles Chart. The song also fared well in other regions of Europe; topping the Polish Singles Chart as well as the Greek charts. It charted at four on the Spanish Singles Chart and at six on Finnish Singles Chart. It reached the top ten in Austria, Italy, Scotland. In France, the song debuted at number 52 and peaked at number 15 on the French Singles Chart, becoming her highest-charting single since her 2011 number one-hit On The Floor and her eleventh top twenty there. "Dance Again" spent 30 weeks on the country's music chart, becoming her third single to achieve this at the time (the fourth and last Lopez's single to also achieve this would be "Ain't Your Mama" (2016), spent 52 weeks and peaked at number 11). In Germany it debuted at number 19. After her performance at television show Wetten, dass..? in October 2012 the song climbed from number 70 to 14 in its 21st week. In New Zealand, it reached 12. In Australia, "Dance Again" debuted at number 44 on May 20, 2012, and peaked at number 28 three weeks later. It also received a platinum certification in Greece, Canada, Italy and Mexico.

== Music video ==
On March 3, 2012, Lopez revealed via social networking website Twitter that she would be shooting a new video for a song entitled "Dance Again", writing "R U Ready 2 #DanceAgain". The clip was directed by Paul Hunter; a longtime collaborator of hers. He had previously worked with her on the music video for her debut single "If You Had My Love" (1999), as well as "Feelin' So Good" (2000) and "Papi" (2011). The following day on March 4, Lopez posted a sneak peek of the shoe she wore in the music video on her official website. On March 31 and April 1, Lopez posted more pictures from the video for "Dance Again" on her official website.

A sneak peek of the video was shown on the April 5, 2012 episode of American Idol, while the full video premiered later that day on Lopez's Vevo Channel. Lopez's boyfriend Casper Smart, also a choreography and dancer, appears in the video. Lopez told Extra TV that it was very "natural" working with Smart, "It was just a very natural thing for us to do that together. Everything that the song is saying—where I'm at—it was just very natural. It didn't feel forced." The video uses product placement for both Lopez's fragrance, Glowing and Voli vodka, for which Pitbull is a spokesperson.

=== Synopsis ===
Lopez in a middle of the orgy scene

The music video for "Dance Again" opens on a black screen, with the words "Always remember... You will live, you will love, you will dance again" printed in white. Lopez is then shown entering a "zero-gravity" room, where a stream of vodka is flowing in the air. She looks up to an "orgy of scantily clad dancers", piled up on one another according to MTV's Jocelyn Vena. Lopez is airlifted from the ground, and joins the erotic orgy. The skirt she was wearing when she entered the room is ripped off, revealing a low-cut top. Smart then enters the room. Vena wrote, "In the bevy of people, Lopez crawls to her guy, he crawls to her, and from there they embark on a love affair, full of pop-and-lock dance moves and blindfolded shenanigans".

RadarOnline commented, "In the video, Casper is extra friendly to J.Lo's derrière, caressing his lady love's famous rear end as she shows off her fab figure in a black Basque and hellacious heels. Casper shows off his sturdy build, which is covered by tattoos." The couple also break into one of Lopez's signature dance breaks.

Scenes with Pitbull shown sitting down in front of a door are shown. Smart is later seen dancing with Lopez while they are both covered in glitter. Towards the end of the clip, Lopez is seen dancing in between two stripper polls in a black studded crop top. She is joined once again by Smart, who she blinds with a blindfold that reads "love is blind", and they later swap roles (these scenes reflected the photo stills posted to Lopez's website days earlier). The video closes with a shot of Lopez's fragrance, Glowing.

=== Response ===
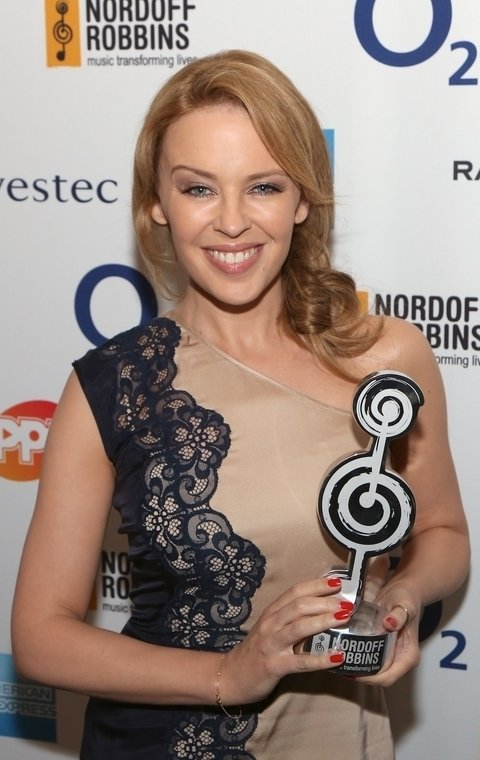
The "Dance Again" music video received comparisons to Kylie Minogue's "All the Lovers" video.

Sarah Maloy of Billboard magazine noted the amount of sexual content in the music video, writing that it as "body glitter, random choreographed dance numbers, poles and sex—lots of sex. Oh and Pitbull's there too, hanging out on the sidelines while J.Lo gets dirty, dabbling in orgies and bondage". Entertainment Weekly's Marc Snetiker observed that although the song was "relatively harmless and catchy, the video is...confusing", but thought it was worth watching. Jenna Hally, writing for MTV Buzzworthy, praised Lopez in the music video, writing "holy moly, how can this woman have birthed two humans and still look this amazing?", however felt that it was inappropriate for its American Idol debut, adding "we thought "Idol" was a family show? This video is less 'sit on the couch and chill with dad' and more 'call your boyfriend over immediately.'" Access Hollywood found similarities between the scene in which Lopez "can be seen grinding on the floor, surrounded by a host of hot bodies" and Australian recording artist Kylie Minogue's music video for "All the Lovers" (2010). AZ Central's Ed Masley heavily criticized the clip for airing on American Idol, and wrote:

"Steven Tyler swaggers past the family-friendly threshold nearly every week on American Idol. But Jennifer Lopez made Tyler appear a bit prim and retiring by comparison when Idol screened her video for "Dance Again," seductively slithering on hands and knees across the floor to meet a lover who's tugging at something in his trousers. I'm not saying there was anything explicit going on. And the version on VEVO goes much heavier on kink. But Idol viewers did get scenes of J.Lo's multi-platinum booty being handled with care by a shirtless male dancer ... She eventually blindfolds the shirtless male dancer, caressing his chest until most five-year-olds could figure out what happens next ... I enjoy a tawdry music video as much as anyone. My problem with the J.Lo clip is "Idol" still pretending it's a family friendly show while screening it—because you can't have everything both ways, despite what Pitbull suggests for your girl in the version on VEVO".

A representative from a Right Wing Group, Dan Gainor, condemned the video, saying it was too steamy for "family-friendly American Idol" and went as far as saying her "skanky new video shows how desperate she is to retain her fame despite her fading relevance". E! Online's Natalie Finn commented, "Pitbull gets to keep his suit on, but Lopez, clad for the most part in a bodysuit and fishnets (and at times a solid coat of glitter) is bare for the grabbing. Her fellow ladies in the video... may have even less on—which is perfect since there's a gravity-defying orgy taking place in the background as Lopez and the well-muscled Smart make eyes at each other".

== Live performances ==
Lopez performed the song on the May 10 results show of American Idol where she used to be a judge. She was dressed in a skin-tight blue bodysuit and black stockings, surrounded by a dozen back-up dancers. On October 6 she performed at the German television show Wetten, dass..?, which is the biggest show in Germany. The song is also a closing number of her first ever world tour, Dance Again World Tour. Lopez performed the song as part of her medley during the 2018 MTV Video Music Awards on August 20, 2018, at Radio City Music Hall in New York City.

== In popular culture ==
The song was covered on the American TV series Glee in the episode "The New Rachel". Sung by Kate Hudson, it was in a mashup with the Lady Gaga song "Americano". In August 2013, a clip of 13-year-old boy Sam Horowitz performing during his Bar Mitzvah became a viral video online. In the video, which garnered significant media attention, Horowitz performs a choreographed dance routine to "Dance Again".

== Track listings ==
CD single / digital download (2-track)

1. "Dance Again" featuring Pitbull – 4:00
2. "Dance Again" – 4:10

Digital download

1. "Dance Again" featuring Pitbull – 4:00

Digital download (Spanish Version)

1. "Bailar Nada Más" (Dance Again – Spanish Version) – 4:00

Digital download (EP)

1. "Dance Again" featuring Pitbull (Extended Mix) – 6:30
2. "Dance Again" featuring Pitbull (Instrumental Version) – 4:00
3. "Dance Again" – 4:09
4. "Dance Again" featuring Pitbull (Music video) – 4:30

== Credits and personnel ==
Adapted from album booklet.

=== Recording ===
- Lead vocals and Background vocals recorded at Henson Recording Studios, Hollywood, California
- Jennifer Lopez vocals recorded at Pinky's Palace
- Pitbull vocals recorded at Al Burna Studios, Miami, Florida
- Mastered at The Mastering Palace, New York City

=== Personnel ===
- RedOne – producer, instruments, programming, vocal arrangement
- Pitbull – lead vocals and background vocals
- Jeanette Olsson – background vocals
- Jennifer Lopez – lead vocals and background vocals
- Josie Aiello – background vocals
- Trevor Muzzy – background vocals
- Teddy Sky – background vocals, vocal editing, mixer
- Jimmy Thornfeldt – background vocals
- Kuk Harrell – Jennifer Lopez vocal producer
- Josh Gudwin – engineer
- Chris "Tek" O'Ryan – engineer, vocal editing
- Anthony Falcone – assistant engineer
- Peter Mack – assistant engineer
- Al Burna – Pitbull vocal recording
- Dave Kutch – mastering

== Charts ==
=== Weekly charts ===
Weekly chart performance for "Dance Again"
Chart (2012–2013)	Peak position
Austria (Ö3 Austria Top 40)	8
Belgium (Ultratop 50 Flanders)	7
Belgium (Ultratop 50 Wallonia)	9
Bulgaria (IFPI)	3
Brazil (Brasil Hot 100 Airplay)	79
Canada Hot 100 (Billboard)	4
Canada CHR/Top 40 (Billboard)	6
Canada Hot AC (Billboard)	13
Denmark (Tracklisten)	11
Euro Digital Songs (Billboard)	12
Finland (Suomen virallinen lista)	6
France (SNEP)	15
Germany (GfK)	14
Global Dance Tracks (Billboard)	1
Greece (IFPI Greece)	1
Honduras (Honduras Top 50)	12
Hungary (Dance Top 40)	15
Hungary (Single Top 40)	2
Ireland (IRMA)	12
Israel International Airplay (Media Forest)	6
Italy (FIMI)	7
Japan (Japan Hot 100)	9
Lebanon (The Official Lebanese Top 20)	9
Mexico (Billboard Mexican Airplay)	13
Mexico (Billboard Ingles Airplay)	2
Mexico Anglo (Monitor Latino)	3
Netherlands (Dutch Top 40)	16
Netherlands (Single Top 100)	19
New Zealand (Recorded Music NZ)	12
Norway (VG-lista)	17
Poland (Dance Top 50)	1
Portugal (Billboard)	2
Scottish Singles Sales (Official Charts)	7
Slovakia Airplay (ČNS IFPI)	8
South Korea (International Chart)	1
Spain (Promusicae)	4
Sweden (Sverigetopplistan)	22
Switzerland (Schweizer Hitparade)	14
UK Singles (Official Charts)	11
Ukraine Airplay (TopHit)	33
US Billboard Hot 100	17
US Pop Airplay (Billboard)	17
US Dance Club Songs (Billboard)	1
US Latin Pop Airplay (Billboard)	4
US Rhythmic Airplay (Billboard)	25
US Tropical Airplay (Billboard)	26

=== Year-end charts ===
Year-end chart performance for "Dance Again"
Chart (2012)	Position
Austria (Ö3 Austria Top 40)	48
Belgium (Ultratop 50 Flanders)	35
Belgium (Ultratop 50 Wallonia)	37
Brazil (Crowley)	67
Canada (Canadian Hot 100)	34
France (SNEP)	74
Germany (Media Control AG)	59
Greece (IFPI)	25
Hungary (Dance Top 40)	85
Hungary (Rádiós Top 40)	84
Italy (FIMI)	35
Netherlands (Dutch Top 40)	72
Netherlands (Single Top 100)	71
Poland (ZPAV)	42
Spain (PROMUSICAE)	11
Sweden (Digilistan)	46
Switzerland (Schweizer Hitparade)	69
Ukraine Airplay (TopHit)	98
US Hot Dance Club Songs	34
US Hot Latin Songs (Billboard)	38

== Certifications ==
Certifications and sales for "Dance Again"
Region	Certification	Certified units/sales
Australia (ARIA)	Platinum	70,000^{^}
Austria (IFPI Austria)	Gold	15,000^{*}
Belgium (BRMA)	Gold	15,000^{*}
Canada (Music Canada)	Platinum	80,000^{*}
Denmark (IFPI Danmark)	Gold	15,000^{^}
Finland (Musiikkituottajat)	Gold	6,000
Germany (BVMI)	Platinum	300,000^{‡}
Italy (FIMI)	Platinum	30,000^{*}
Mexico (AMPROFON)	2× Platinum+Gold	150,000^{*}
Spain (Promusicae)	Gold	20,000^{*}
Sweden (GLF)	Platinum	40,000^{‡}
United Kingdom (BPI)	Silver	200,000^{‡}
United States (RIAA)	Platinum	1,000,000^{^}
Streaming
Denmark (IFPI Danmark)	Platinum	1,800,000^{†}
^{*} Sales figures based on certification alone.^{^} Shipments figures based on certification alone.^{‡} Sales+streaming figures based on certification alone.^{†} Streaming-only figures based on certification alone.

== Release history ==
Release dates for "Dance Again"
Country	Date	Format	Label	Ref.
Belgium	April 2, 2012	Digital download	Sony	
Finland	April 2, 2012	Digital download	Sony	
France	April 2, 2012	Digital download	Sony	
Italy	April 2, 2012	Digital download	Sony	
Netherlands	April 2, 2012	Digital download	Sony	
Norway	April 2, 2012	Digital download	Sony	
Spain	April 2, 2012	Digital download	Sony	
United States	April 2, 2012	Digital download	Epic	
New Zealand	April 3, 2012	Digital download	Sony	
Singapore	April 3, 2012	Digital download	Sony	
United States	April 3, 2012	Contemporary hit radio	Epic	
United States	April 3, 2012	Rhythmic crossover radio	Epic	
Germany	April 10, 2012	Digital download	Sony	
Germany	May 18, 2012	CD single	Sony	
Germany	May 18, 2012	Digital download (2-track)	Sony	
United Kingdom	May 20, 2012	Digital download	RCA	
United States	May 25, 2012	Digital download (Spanish Version)	Epic	

== See also ==
- List of number-one dance singles of 2012 (U.S.)
