= Orris root =

Term for the roots of certain iris plants

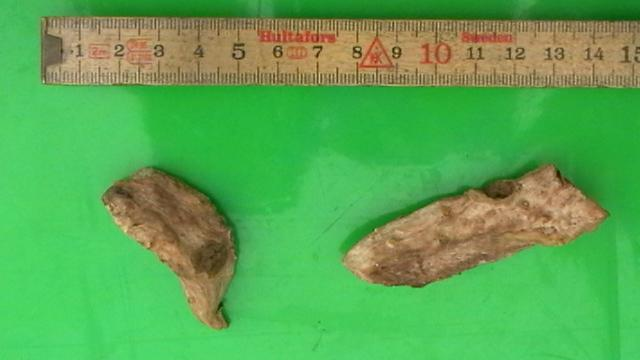
Dried orris roots

Orris root (Rhizoma iridis; etymology possibly an alteration of iris) is the root of Iris germanica and Iris pallida. It had the common name of Queen Elizabeth Root. It is commonly used as a fixative and base note in perfumery and as a botanical in gin.

== Constituent chemicals ==
The most valued component of orris root is oil of orris (0.1–0.2%), a yellow-white mass containing myristic acid. Oil of orris is sometimes sold as orris butter.

Other components include fat, resin, starch, mucilage, bitter extractive, and a glucoside called iridin or irisin.

== Uses ==
Once important in western herbal medicine, it is now used mainly as a fixative and base note in perfumery; it is the most widely used fixative for potpourri. Orris is also an ingredient in many brands of gin, including Bombay Sapphire.

Fabienne Pavia, in her book L'univers des Parfums (1995, ed. Solar), states that in the manufacturing of perfumes using orris, the scent of the iris root differs from that of the flower. After preparation the scent is reminiscent of the smell of violets.

In Japan, the roots and leaves of the plant were hung in the eaves of a house to protect the house and occupants from attacks by evil spirits. Other magic uses include using it as a love potion, with the root powder in sachets, or sprinkled around the house or sheets of a bedroom.

== Preparation ==
After an initial drying period, which can take five years or more depending on the use (for potpourri only two to three months), the root is ground. For potpourri, this powder is used without further processing. For other uses, it is dissolved in water and then distilled. It achieves a highly scented, yellow-brown crystalline form. One ton of iris root produces two kilos of essential oil, also referred to as orris root butter or butter of iris, and it is the most expensive substance used in the fragrance industry. Its fragrance has been described as tenaciously flowery, heavy and woody (paraphrasing Pavia, Dutch translation, page 40). It is similar to violets.

== In perfume ==
Typical iris perfumes (where orris prevails over the other components) include "Orris Noir" by the London-based perfume house Ormonde Jayne Perfumery, "Infusion d'iris" (Prada), "N°15" by Auphorie, "Iris Silver Mist" (Serge Lutens), "Tumulte" (Christian Lacroix), "Iris nobile" (Aqua di Parma), "Irisia" (Creed), "Y" (Yves Saint Laurent), "Vol de nuit" (Guerlain), and "Fantasy The Naughty Remix" (Britney Spears). "Orris Noir" contains regular orris root oil, not the oil of Iris nigricans, which is an endangered species.

== In cuisine ==
Orris root is often included as one of the many ingredients of ras el hanout, a blend of herbs and spices used across the Middle East and North Africa, primarily associated with Moroccan cuisine.

Orris root has been used in tinctures to flavour syrups; its taste is said to be indistinguishable from raspberry.

Orris root powder also had a use as the base in the making of nonpareils.
