= Glow by JLo =

1998 perfume endorsed by Jennifer Lopez

Fragrance by Jennifer Lopez
- Notes: Orange, grapefruit, jasmine, orris, irises, vanilla, musk
- Released: September 2002
- Label: Coty
- Tagline: Fresh-Sexy-Clean
- Flanker(s): Flanker fragrances: Miami Glow by JLo; Love at First Glow by JLo; Glow After Dark by JLo; Sunkissed Glow by JLo; Blue Glow by JLo; L.A. Glow by JLo
- Successor: Still Jennifer Lopez

Glow by JLo is a women's fragrance endorsed by American entertainer Jennifer Lopez, and released through Coty, Inc. It was conceived as far back as 1998 when Lopez announced a lifestyle line that would include a fragrance. Contradictory to assumptions that it would be unsuccessful, it performed extremely well, becoming America's top-selling fragrance. Glow Industries filed a lawsuit against Lopez and Coty to not use the term "Glow", however, a judge denied their request. Along with products from Lopez's fashion and lifestyle line, it brought in over $300 million by 2004. Subsequently, Glow became a successful woman's fragrance line.

Glow has spawned several flankers, with the first being Miami Glow, and the most recent being L.A. Glow. In May 2012, she released her eighteenth fragrance, Glowing by JLo, which was described as the "evolution" of Glow and marked her 10-year anniversary working with Coty. Since Glow, Lopez has been credited with influencing other celebrity endorsements of fragrance, which has included Halle Berry, Beyoncé, Lady Gaga and Madonna, among others.

== Conception and scent ==
On April 2, 1998, it was announced during a press conference that Lopez would be launching a clothing line, entitled J.Lo by Jennifer Lopez, in time for the holiday season. The line, which would eventually also include eyewear, swimwear, accessories and a fragrance, was backed up by an investment group led by Andy Hilfiger and Larry Stemmerman. Of the fragrance, Lopez said: "I wanted Glow to be fresh and clean, but still sexy and sensual – something that feels like you just came out of the shower and are the sexiest person in the world." Glow by J.Lo contains notes of: orange, grapefruit, jasmine, orris, irises, vanilla and musk. Lopez said the fragrance was created to fit what she would want to wear herself. The perfume is a combination of Lopez's favorite scents. The fragrance is packaged in a clear white bottle, with curvaceous lines to look like a woman's body. Lopez's "J.Lo" logo is written in rhinestones on the bottle. It comes with a complimentary chain inspired by Lopez's style.

== Release and impact ==
The fragrance is sold at every-day shopping outlets like Macy's and pharmacy chains. A limited edition extended play was released alongside the fragrance, featuring the "Everbot's Showtime Edit" of Jenny from the Block and the "Alt. Main New Hook" version of "The One".

The release of Glow by JLo succeeded expectations, becoming the second-highest seller in the American market. In 2004 Lopez's clothing lines J.Lo by Jennifer Lopez and Sweetface, and her fragrances Glow by JLo and Still Jennifer Lopez together brought in more than $300 million in revenue, making her the nineteenth richest person under 40, according to Fortune magazine. The release of Glow by JLo "spawned a wave of new celebrity fragrances". Collectively with her fragrances Glow By JLo and Still Jennifer Lopez, the fragrance brought in over $100 million in the space of 2005 alone. Julie Naughton and Pete Born of WWD noted that Benrd Beetz, Coty's CEO, said that with Glow by JLo, Lopez started the trend of celebrity-endorsed fragrances, writing: "Beetz credits the successful Lopez project for laying the groundwork for the company's other celebrity brands, which include Halle Berry and Beyoncé, and the upcoming Lady Gaga and Madonna fragrances. While some have been sounding a death knell for the celebrity category over the past few years, Beetz remains adamant that it is a sustainable business model. “We're going to prove it again with Madonna. We're going to prove it again with Lady Gaga. The fragrance is a defining tool to create an image for an artist or a celebrity. It is not an afterthought. It is a central part of building a brand. And if you build it one way it's going to extend in other areas." Lopez has been credited with the resurrection of celebrity's endorsement of fragrances. Chief executive of Coty, Bernd Beetz, stated that he believes Lopez could last longer than Elizabeth Taylor and her fragrance, White Diamonds.

== Lawsuit ==
In 2002 Glow Industries filed a lawsuit against Lopez and Coty asking that Lopez and her company to stop using the name as their own perfume, which would be released in August 2003, as it can cause confusion. A judge denied their request; as Glow Industries hadn't demonstrated how consumer confusion would occur, or even a likelihood for it. Lopez and Coty's representative, Lisa Pearson, argued that the two separate products had completely different packages and wouldn't even be sold in similar outlets.

== Products ==
The products for Glow By JLo−

- Eau de Toilette Spray 3.4 fl oz / 100ml
- Eau de Toilette Spray 1.7 fl oz / 50ml
- Eau de Toilette Spray 1.0 fl oz / 30ml
- Body Lotion 6.7 fl oz / 200ml
- Shower Gel 6.7 fl oz / 200ml

== Flanker fragrances ==
Pictured is a miniature collection package of Glow by JLo and three of its flanker fragrances: Miami Glow, Love at First Glow and Glow After Dark

Lopez released a limited edition of Glow, entitled Miami Glow by JLo, on December 17, 2004, at select department stores. Speaking about the theme of the perfume, Lopez stated: "Besides my home town of New York, Miami is my favorite city in the whole world. I love the air when you get off the plane. I love being next to the ocean. I love the cultural mix of people". It was created by Caroline Sabas. The fragrance was officially launched at her first Runway Show on February 17, 2005, where she also introduced her "Sweetface" clothing line. A runway special dedicated to the new fragrance and her clothing line, Jennifer Lopez: Beyond The Runway aired on MTV and featured Lopez's process in making Miami Glow. The fragrance is a summer perfume, and contains notes of passionfruit, coconut, amber, orange flower and vanilla. The perfume bottle is the same shape as the Glow by JLo bottle, it has gold flip-flop charms on it. Collectively with her fragrances Glow by JLo and Still Jennifer Lopez, the fragrance brought in over $100 million in the space of 2005 alone.

The second flanker fragrance is Love at First Glow by JLO. Lancaster had previously announced in October 2005 that they were preparing Lopez's new fragrance, which was her fourth. It was created by Steve Demercado in 2005. Love at First Glow is a fragrance dedicated to "emulate the feeling of first love" and has notes of bergamot, neroli, peach, pink jasmine, wild rose, osmanthus and fluid freesia. At the base, there is musk, blond woods and vanilla absolute. The bottle comes with a complimentary J. Lo logo mobile phone charm. Glow After Dark by JLo is the third flanker fragrance. Glow After Dark has the same bottle as the original Glow, with only a black J.Lo mobile phone charm that can be taken off, made out of dark crystals. The scent contains notes of lychee, melon, passionfruit, mandarine, ozone, white cherry, freesia, rose, orange, patchouli, moss, and blonde woods.

Sunkissed Glow by JLo is the fourth flanker endorsed by Lopez. It is inspired by a tropical scent of breeze and the steamy sun; it has notes of flowery and fruity orange blossom, water lilies and passion flowers. It was created by Caroline Sabas. Robin from Now Smell This said "Sunkissed Glow is nicely done and gets a plus in my book for not smelling like candy ... despite the fact that I'm not usually a huge fan of coconut in perfume, I prefer the original Miami Glow. It was just more fun. I understand it can still be found at some of the discount chains, so you might want to try both scents before you make up your mind." It is available in 30, 50, and 100ml Eau de Toilette. Blue Glow by JLo is the fifth flanker of Glow endorsed by Jennifer Lopez. Released in Spring 2010, it is a "refreshing watery fragrance" and has notes of water lily, vanilla orchid, sea wood, cedar and mangosteen; the bottle comes with a complimentary silver anklet. L.A. Glow by JLo was released in early 2011, as the sixth flanker of Glow. It is also Lopez's sixteenth fragrance. It contains notes of cherry, purple plum, blackberry, jasmine, peony, magnolia blossum, musk and amber. According to Lopez's parfum website, the fragrance is inspired by the hip, high energy Los Angeles nightlife. The fragrance appeared on The Ellen DeGeneres Show during a hidden camera prank DeGeneres and Lopez did. Rio Glow by JLo is the seventh flanker of Glow, endorsed by Jennifer Lopez. The fragrance is limited edition. Released in Summer 2013, it is inspired by the city of Rio de Janeiro, therefore continuing the line's reoccurring theme of interesting cities (L.A Glow & Miami Glow). The perfume has notes of peach, apple, pear, vanilla and orange blossom. The fragrance does not come with any removable charms, unlike the other fragrances in the line, which all have a charm of some sort attached to their bottles. Wild Glow by JLo is the eighth flanker of Glow, endorsed by Jennifer Lopez. The fragrance is a limited edition that was released in December 2014. The perfume's inspiration was the "upbeat rhythm of the music that pulses through the club and bright lights that represent the joys of life". The perfume has notes of blackcurrant, tropical fruits, heliotrope and jasmine. Like Rio Glow before it, the fragrance has no charms attached to its bottle.

== See also ==
- List of celebrity-branded fragrances
