= Basenotes =

United Kingdom-based online fragrance resource

- Website type: Online perfume database
- Available in: English
- Creator: Grant Osborne
- Website: basenotes.net
- Commercial: Yes
- Registration: Optional
- Users: 194,640 (May 2018)
- Launched: August 2000
- Current status: Online

Basenotes is a United Kingdom-based online fragrance resource which includes a fragrance database, message boards and editorial. The site was launched in August 2000 by Grant Osborne as an information site for men's fragrance and grooming. In 2004, the site expanded to include feminine fragrances.

== Basenotes Fragrance Directory ==
The Basenotes Fragrance Directory contains over 20,000 fragrances and over 90,000 fragrance reviews by the site's visitors. Users of the site can search for fragrances by name, house, year of launch, gender, notes (ingredients), perfumer or bottle designer. Visitors to the site can submit information to be included in the directory.

The consumer reviews on the site have been described as "admirably prosaic" by Alexis Petridis in The Guardian.

=== Basenotes Fragrance Awards ===
Each year, Basenotes asks visitors to the site to vote for their favorite fragrances that year. Regular winners include Old Spice, Shalimar, Vetiver de Guerlain, Chanel No.5, YSL M7, Green Irish Tweed and A*Men. There are also categories for the best new fragrance and best celebrity fragrance.

== Awards and recognition ==
Basenotes has won five awards for its editorial content, written by Marian Bendeth, at The Canadian Fragrance Awards in 2007, 2008 and 2009.

In 2009, the website won a prize for Best Web Editorial at the Jasmine Awards for an article by the writer, Liz Upton. The following year, the same prize was won by the Basenotes writer, Walker Minton. In 2018, Claire Vukcevic won the Best Practical Guide Award for her guide to summer fragrances on Basenotes.
