= True Love (book) =

2014 autobiography by Jennifer Lopez

- Author: Jennifer Lopez
- Language: English; Spanish
- Published: November 4, 2014
- Publisher: Celebra
- Publication place: United States
- Media type: Print (Hardcover) Print (Paperback)
- Pages: 288 (English); 288 (Spanish)
- ISBN: 978-0-451-46868-0 (English); 978-0-451-46870-3 (Spanish)

True Love (Spanish: Amor Verdadero) is a book written by the American entertainer Jennifer Lopez. A hardcover edition of the book was published in English and Spanish on November 4, 2014, by Celebra, a division of the Penguin Group. A portion of the proceeds from True Love goes to the Lopez Family Foundation, a nonprofit organization co-founded by Lopez that is dedicated to improving the health and well-being of women and children.

== Background and development ==
While on her first headlining concert tour Dance Again World Tour, Lopez began writing what she described as "a diary of the year I went on tour". To her surprise, as the tour progressed, she came to the realization that what she was writing was a book. Lopez was nervous about writing about certain topics for the book, but later realized that in doing so, she could have a chance to save others from "suffering their own bumps and bruises". According to Lopez, she had to do a lot of "soul searching and praying", as she did not want it to be "mistaken for anything other than it was", which is "sharing something I learned with people I could help." In True Love, Lopez also discusses suffering from low self-esteem issues, partly as a result of her being in the public eye. Louise Hay's book, You Can Heal Your Life, is mentioned in the book, and her meeting with the author, as a major guide in working on herself and in writing True Love itself.

The book was officially announced on May 19, 2014, by Celebra, a division of the Penguin Group. About it, Lopez said: “Writing 'True Love' has been a deeply cathartic, personal, and vulnerable experience. If it were not for the love and courage given to me by my children, this story wouldn’t have been possible. While I struggled with the decision of whether or not to release this book, I recognized that if it could touch even just one person then it would honestly become one of the most fulfilling endeavors of my life." Lopez initially did not intend to include content about her recent divorce from Marc Anthony in True Love, but said "the book evolved into something different than what I had intended it to be because of what I went through".

== Reception ==
True Love reached number seven on The New York Times Best Seller list, and number five on the Hardcover non-fiction chart.

In a review, Elise De Los Santos of RedEye remarked, "Like a broken record, she repeats her “love yourself” mantra again and again throughout the book, which devolves at certain points into a one-sided life-coaching session." Santos, however, also noted that "Her strongest suit is showing the human side of the celebrity tabloid fodder we all eat up."
