= Jennifer Lopez Collection =

Celebrity-lifestyle retail brand

- Industry: Retail
- Founded: 2010
- Defunct: 2020
- Headquarters: United States
- Key people: Jennifer Lopez
- Products: Sportswear, dresses, handbags, jewelry, shoes, sleepwear, bedding, towels
- Website: Online store

The Jennifer Lopez Collection was an American lifestyle brand created by American entertainer Jennifer Lopez. It was sold exclusively in Kohl's department stores and on their website. In Mexico, the collection is sold at department store Coppel. In November 2010, Kohl's announced the partnership with Lopez and her ex-husband Marc Anthony. Following Lopez and Anthony's divorce, the lines were marked as two separate brands. In May 2020, Kohl’s announced it would be removing 8 of its brands, including the Jennifer Lopez Collection, due to the coronavirus pandemic.

The Jennifer Lopez Collection included contemporary sportswear, dresses, handbags, jewelry, shoes, sleepwear, and a home collection.

== Background ==
Lopez and Anthony’s partnership with Kohl's was announced during a press conference at the London Hotel in Los Angeles, California on November 18, 2010. The deal, which was marketed as "the first celebrity couple to simultaneously design collections for one retailer", was aimed at including men's and women's clothing, as well as house wares. Lopez's collection was revealed to feature women's dresses, sportswear, handbags and jewelry, while Anthony's was to contain men's dress shirts, ties, sport coats and shoes. Kohl's expected "the his-and-hers line" to expand into home accessories over time. The new venture was expected to generate up to $3 billion in additional sales for Kohl's in its first year alone.

Following the couple's separation in July 2011, it was announced that the line would go forward as two separate clothing lines. Rick Darling, the president of LF USA, which is sublicensing the brands to Kohl's exclusively, added: "We have two separate agreements with Jennifer and Marc and always intended to have separate lines. [Their split] doesn't impact the agreements in any way."

In June 2014, Billboard reported Lopez received 5% of all revenues from her collection.

== Collections ==
=== Fall 2011 ===
The fall 2011 collection was previewed in the August 2011, edition of O, The Oprah Magazine. In the magazine, Lopez is shown "modeling her faux-fur-lined belted sweater with skinny jeans and matching boots". Eight O readers were also styled in the collection, which included "on-trend animal prints paired with neutral colors" that Lopez labeled as "accessible, everyday glamour." The full look book for the collection, was released on August 17. The collection became available at Kohl's department stores and at Kohls.com starting on September 11, 2011. The debut of Lopez's and Anthony's lines marked the biggest product launch in the retailer's history, according to CEO Kevin Mansell.

The line, whose items range in price from $22 to $150, was inspired by Lopez's "glamorous and cosmopolitan lifestyle" as a "globally recognized entertainer". "The contemporary collection is easy, comfortable and designed for women who want effortless, sophisticated style at a great value."

=== Spring 2012 ===
On February 29, Lopez posted photos from the commercial shoot for the spring collection onto her official website. The commercial was on March 4. The commercial was directed by Darren Aronofsky.

=== Fall 2012 ===
The fall 2012 collection focuses on "trendy elements that accentuate femininity". The collection includes numerous autumnal elements, dresses to knitted cardigans, stylish shirts, maxi skirts and sweaters.
