= Teeology =

American electronic commerce

- Industry: Electronic commerce
- Founder: Jennifer Lopez; Erica Zohar
- Headquarters: Los Angeles, U.S.
- Key people: Jennifer Lopez (chief curator); Erica Zohar (curator); Peter Kim (curator)
- Products: T-shirts

Teeology, Inc. is a Los Angeles-based electronic commerce co-founded by American entertainer Jennifer Lopez and fashion designer Erica Zohar. Launched on July 12, 2012, the company offers high-end limited edition T-shirts designed by various artists and designers, as well as a permanent collection of basics for men and women. It makes use of new technology and social network tools to "disrupt the traditional retail model".

== Foundation and launch ==
Teeology was co-founded by American recording artist and actress Jennifer Lopez and fashion designer Erica Zohar. They teamed up with Brian Lee and MJ Eng to design the company's "innovative" shopping portal, which uses new technology and social networking tools to "disrupt the traditional retail model". Of Teeology, Lopez stated that it is a "different type of online experience", where "you get to be involved in which designs get made. And it gives us a beeline to what people really like". Lee had previously helped launch the legal document site LegalZoom with lawyer Robert Shapiro and the subscription-based women's shoe site ShoeDazzle with reality television star Kim Kardashian. Lopez, who models for the company, also acts as its chief curator. The website was officially launched on Thursday, July 12, 2012.

Eng explained the creation of the company by stating: "The idea started when we realised more and more customers have become increasingly spoiled with private sale discounts online. We know the markups. So rather than building a brand around cost structures, price points and overhanging inventory that you have to liquidate, why not have a lean model and offer good prices right off the bat?"

== Products ==
=== Limited edition designs ===
Teeology offers high-end limited edition T-shirts designed by "various artists and designers". Designers can submit their own T-shirts designs, which are then considered by the company's curators. From the designs they are sent, the curators create a shortlist of designs to be included in a poll. Some of these designs were created by willylopezart.com Members of the website can then vote for T-shirt designs and the winning designs will go into immediate production.

=== Basics ===
Teeology also offers a permanent collection of "basics" for men and women.

== Reception ==
Julia Fernandez of Grazia Daily stated that Teeology "certainly adds a more exciting element to online shopping".
