= Viva Móvil =

American retail service

Viva Móvil by Jennifer Lopez
- Type: Limited liability company
- Industry: Retail
- Founded: 2013
- Founder: Jennifer Lopez
- Defunct: 2016
- Headquarters: California, United States
- Number of locations: 15 (by the end of 2013)
- Area served: United States
- Key people: Jennifer Lopez (CCO)
- Services: Verizon Wireless
- Website: getviva.com

Viva Móvil, LLC, branded as Viva Móvil by Jennifer Lopez, was an American retail service founded by American entertainer Jennifer Lopez.

== History ==
Viva Móvil was created by American entertainer Jennifer Lopez in collaboration with Brightstar Corporation and Moorehead Communications. The company announced their partnership with Verizon Wireless on May 22, 2013 at the CTIA tradeshow. Many had been anticipating that Verizon Wireless would be announcing its offering the HTC One at the event. According to Lopez,

This new company is here to revolutionize the entire mobile experience for Latinos. There's no specific place for Latinos to be specifically catered to. We will continuously evolve the wireless shopping experience with Verizon Wireless's guidance and support.

As of 2016, the Viva Móvil brand doesn't exist anymore and Jennifer Lopez is no longer attached to the project.

== Products and stores ==
The company's concept is to allow customers to shop for phone service, phones and phone accessories online, via Facebook and other social networks, and at retail locations. The company's first store was scheduled to open in New York City on June 15, 2013. Fifteen stores were expected to open in 2013 in cities across the United States, including Los Angeles and Miami. Each store is planned to include a large array of devices for people to try out before they decide on their purchase. Plans call for the stores to have play areas for children. In an article containing details regarding the company's first store located in Brooklyn, New York, Simone Weichselbaum of The New York Daily News noted that it was "vibrant", and unlike typical Verizon stores, the Viva Móvil store has brighter colors, bilingual staff and play area for children. In addition, multiple pictures of Lopez, as well as wall television screens playing music videos, are present, among various other specific features.

In an analysis of Viva Móvil's strategy, Wireless Week's Ben Munson commented that the company's appeal to "'social commerce' is indicative of the trend toward consumers educating themselves – via learning from friends or reading research, reviews and news – and buying their wireless devices and service away from the retail shops." He suggested that "carrier stores and wireless retailers could go further in making the customer feel valued especially considering how big of a time and financial commitment many of them are making" and that "the least the carriers can do is make the 90 minutes or so spent in the store a little less excruciating."
