= Lopez Family Foundation =

Organization

- Founded: 2009
- Founder: Jennifer Lopez; Lynda Lopez
- Dissolved: 2016
- Type: Foundation
- Formerly called: The Maribel Foundation

The Lopez Family Foundation was an American nonprofit organization founded by sisters, Jennifer Lopez and Lynda Lopez in 2009. Originally founded as 'The Maribel Foundation', it was named after Jennifer's then-husband Marc Anthony's sister Maribel, who died due to a brain cancer at age 8. As of 2016, the foundation ceased operations.

== Background ==
=== Development ===
Since early in her life, she has been passionate about supporting children; For example, her album Rebirth (Jennifer Lopez album) is dedicated to Paige Peterson, an eleven-year-old cancer patient whom Lopez befriended during visits to the Children's Hospital Los Angeles. Peterson died in November 2004. Lopez noting that, "I don't like to do my charity work in public. That's not what you do it for." At the annual The Women's Conference in 2008, Jennifer first talked about plans for her foundation, which will "prioritize the importance of empowerment". She stated: "I have lots of big dreams and envision big changes toward proper healthcare, prenatal care, pediatric care. And that, coming together in the biggest possible way is what I believe women are capable of". She confirmed that the foundation being built would focus on women, health, children and education. On May 14, 2009 Jennifer appeared at the Noche de Niños gala benefit for the Children's Hospital of Los Angeles where she further discussed information about 'The Maribel Foundation'. The Lopez sisters partnered with the Children's Hospital of Los Angeles to provide services for the less fortunate.

=== Inspiration ===
Jennifer has credited her pregnancy as the driving force behind creating 'The Maribel Foundation', which she calls "close to my heart". It was named after Jennifer's (then) husband Marc Anthony's sister Maribel who died after being diagnosed with a brain tumor at the age of eight. She has said that the most "empowering thing" she has ever done is "Probably giving birth. And as a direct result of that, setting up a charity with my sister Lynda." The sisters had dreamed of developing a charity, Jennifer explained: "It was a dream we had for a long time. Once we had babies we were ready to say, 'Let's do it'. We're not claiming to change the world in one day, we're just going to do our little part." While planning the foundation, they knew that it would always be focused on helping women and children's health and education.

Although they had thought about it for a long time, it was not until Jennifer's daughter, Emme, experienced a medical scare, when they went ahead with creating the foundation. When Emme was three weeks old, a bump was discovered on her head. She was rushed to the hospital where an MRI scan was performed, but she was given the okay. Jennifer said at the Noche de Niños gala: "I started to wonder, what if I couldn't afford a doctor or receive the medicines, the procedures?" It was after this when she joined forces with the Los Angeles Children's hospital. In December 2011, she said of the situation: "What if I didn't have that? What if I didn't have access to great health care? What if I was a mom just sitting there and there was something wrong with my baby and there was nothing I could do about it?" She felt that there were mothers out there that didn't have the luxuries she did, and wanted to help.

== Goals and services ==
The number of children that grow up without access to quality health care, doctors, and health care facilities, is unacceptable.

— Jennifer Lopez

In a letter from the foundation's official website, Jennifer discussed their main goal, which was to "dramatically increase the availability of quality health care and health education for women and children, regardless of their ability to pay." She also wrote that the foundation was important for bringing a "greater sense of security and well-being to under-served and under-privileged communities." The foundation will help parents who don't have access to medical services and health care facilities, and therefore can't be informed about critical child and health care topics. It works with Telemedicine clinics abroad and near to increase healthcare for serious cases.

The Telemedicine program consists of digital equipment and video conference stations that will allow doctors to interact with their patients in other locations, to come up with a diagnosis and plan a treatment. This includes regular consultations in cases of emergency, transportation of data and emergency updates. Additionally, the foundation has partnered with multiple hospitals and organizations which are "dedicated to making positive changes in communities" around the world.

== History ==
At the Noche de Niños gala in May 2009, Jennifer unveiled a song dedicated to her twins entitled "One Step at a Time" which was used as promotion for the foundation. In the ballad, she sings: "Let's keep this time for us and make it last as long as we can. It's already going too fast." In June 2010, Jennifer and Marc Anthony performed at the annual Samsung's Four Seasons of Ninth Gala to raise money for the foundation. CS Choi, present and CEO of Samsung Electronics America was "thrilled" about their appearance, finding it "especially encouraging" to see business partners and entertainers come together to "benefit children’s lives through The Maribel Foundation and our Samsung’s Four Seasons of Hope charities." Of the performance, Lopez stated: "Marc and I are honored to participate in Samsung’s Four Seasons of Hope gala because of Samsung’s reputation for being an exceptionally generous corporate citizen." Anthony noted that through Samsung's Four Seasons of Hope program, "valuable" funds could be raised to "further the affordability and availability of services and facilities to both women and children." Additionally, Anthony praised the partnership between Samsung and the foundation. Jennifer is featured in an advertisement for the foundation's partnership with Samsung and Best Buy. Jennifer and Lynda appeared on the Larry King Live television show on June 18, 2010 for publicity of the foundation.

On October 25, 2011, the foundation received a $500,000 donation pledge from Samsung and Best Buy. In 2012, The Maribel Foundation's name was changed to the 'Lopez Family Foundation'. As of March 2012, American businessman Ray Dalio has donated $775,000 to the foundation, making him their largest contributor. In July 2012, Jennifer visited Panama as part of the first leg of her Dance Again World Tour. She took time out to visit the Panama Children's Hospital with Lynda, where they donated medical equipment. They also attended a ceremony where Jennifer gave a speech and explained: "Having this foundation that provides medical assistance is truly a blessing because it gives us the chance to offer health care and education to thousands of people". In the press release, The Lopez Family Foundation announced that the equipment consists of seven telemedicine systems which will be installed in multiple pediatric centers around Panama. Through Charitybuzz, the foundation holds bids to meet Lopez during her tour. That October, the sisters attended the UNESCO (United Nations Educational Scientific Cultural Organization) Charity gala in Düsseldorf, Germany where the foundation was honored with the 'Pyramide con Marni award'.

In 2013, the Lopez Family Foundation was named the winner of the American Telemedicine Association (ATA) Humanitarian Award. In honor of this win, Joel E. Barthelemy, Founder and Managing Director of GlobalMed, presented Lopez with a $50,000 check to support the foundation. Barthelemy stated, "The Lopez Family Foundation is an amazing organization that is giving the opportunity for quality healthcare to families and children in areas that need it the most."

In 2014 the Lopez Family Foundation partnered with the Montefiore Medical Center to create the Center for a Healthy Childhood.

In 2016 the Lopez Family Foundation stopped operations and its tax filings, and allowed its web domain (lopezfamilyfoundation.org) to lapse.
