= Let's Get Loud (disambiguation) =

"Let's Get Loud" is a song recorded by Jennifer Lopez.

Let's Get Loud may also refer to:

- Let's Get Loud (concerts), a set of 2001 concerts by Jennifer Lopez
- Jennifer Lopez: Let's Get Loud, a 2003 DVD by Jennifer Lopez
- "Let's Get Loud" (Suntribe song), a song by Suntribe, representing Estonia in the Eurovision Song Contest 2005
