= Waiting for Tonight =

1997 song by 3rd Party, recorded by Jennifer Lopez in 1999

Single by Jennifer Lopez

from the album On the 6
- Released: September 7, 1999
- Recorded: Mid-1999
- Studio: Cove City Sound; The Dream Factory; Hit Factory; Sony Music (New York City)
- Genre: Dance-pop; Latin house
- Length: 4:06
- Label: Work; Epic
- Songwriters: Maria Christensen; Michael Garvin; Phil Temple
- Producers: Ric Wake; Richie Jones

Jennifer Lopez singles chronology
"No Me Ames" (1999)	"Waiting for Tonight" (1999)	"Feelin' So Good" (2000)

Music videos
- "Waiting for Tonight" on YouTube; "Waiting for Tonight" (remix) on YouTube; "Una Noche Más" (Spanish version) on YouTube

"Waiting for Tonight" is a song written by Maria Christensen, Michael Garvin and Phil Temple. It was originally recorded by Christensen's girl group 3rd Party for their debut studio album, Alive (1997). Two years after the group disbanded, American singer Jennifer Lopez recorded her own version of the song for her debut studio album, On the 6 (1999). Ric Wake and Richie Jones produced Lopez's Hispanic house version of "Waiting for Tonight", which differs from the German-sounding Europop version that was recorded by 3rd Party. A Spanish version of the song, entitled "Una Noche Más", was adapted by Manny Benito and also recorded for the album. "Waiting for Tonight" was released on September 7, 1999, by the Work Group, as the third single from On the 6.

Music critics have credited "Waiting for Tonight", along with several other Lopez dance songs, for making her one of the leading artists in the dance-pop genre. The single reached the top ten in Australia, Belgium, Canada, Finland, France, Greece, Hungary, Italy, the Netherlands, New Zealand, Spain, the United Kingdom, and the United States. "Waiting for Tonight" became Lopez's first song to top the US Billboard Dance Club Play chart. The song also went number one on European radio. It earned her a nomination for the Grammy Award for Best Dance Recording at the 42nd Annual Grammy Awards in 2000.

The music video for the song was directed by Francis Lawrence and depicts a New Years theme-party celebrating the upcoming millennium, as well as a potential Y2K problem. The song was nominated for two MTV Video Music Awards, where it received the MTV Video Music Award for Best Dance Video. Lopez has performed the song on television programs such as Dick Clark's New Year's Rockin' Eve and the 11th Billboard Music Awards. Lopez and Australian music producer Fisher released a "contemporary" remix of "Waiting for Tonight", 25 years after the song's release.

== Writing and composition ==
"Waiting for Tonight" was written by Maria Christensen, Michael Garvin and Phil Temple, originally recorded by Christensen's girl group 3rd Party. Jennifer Lopez recorded her own version of "Waiting for Tonight" three years after the group's break-up for her debut studio album, On the 6 (1999). The song was first presented to Lopez and her producer Cory Rooney by Ric Wake. Lopez "hated the song" in its early demo format saying "I never want to hear that song again. It's horrible and so cheesy", while Rooney believed it had potential. Rooney said: "I begged [Ric] and said, 'Look, please we need to go back on this song. We need to work on this song and really produce it out.'" Wake informed Rooney that it would cost too much to rework the song, and Rooney subsequently paid $50,000, stating: "That's how much I believe the record is gonna be a hit for her." Upon hearing the new version, Lopez loved it, and wanted to record it right away.

Ric Wake provided the production for Lopez's version, which according to Garvin, differs from the "very German-sounding" Europop version that was recorded by 3rd Party. Richie Jones also produced the song and arranged it with Wake, while providing additional programming and arranging along with "Young" Dave Scheuer. Christensen, Jane Barrett and Margaret Dorn performed background vocals. Eric Kupper and Diego Sánchez played the keyboards, while Jones played the drums and percussion. Scheuer, Franklyn Grant, and Thomas R. Yezzi provided engineering for the song, with assistance from Juan Bohorquez and Robb Williams, while David Barrett served as production coordinator. The song was recorded at various recording locations in New York City, including Cove City Sound Studios, The Dream Factory, Hit Factory and Sony Music Studios. The song was later mixed by Diego Sánchez at Cove City Sound Studios as well as Crescent Moon Studios.

"Waiting for Tonight" is a dance-pop song with a length of four minutes and six seconds (4:06). According to the digital music sheet published at Musicnotes.com, the song is written in the key of B♭ minor. It follows a chord progression B♭m–A♭6–Fm7–G♭maj7. The instrumentation of "Waiting for Tonight" consists of a piano and guitar. The song has a tempo of 125 beats per minute. Sofia Vyas of Time Out described the song as a combination of disco, 1980s pop, 1990s R&B, and club music. "Waiting for Tonight" has sensual lyrics, with Lopez comparing her sex life to a movie scene.

== Critical reception ==
"Waiting for Tonight" is the best song of Lopez's career according to Entertainment Weekly, the Chicago Tribune, and Slant Magazine, being well received by radio, and with MTV describing the song as "classic Lopez". "Waiting for Tonight" was used frequently as a celebratory anthem, along with another Lopez song, "Let's Get Loud". People magazine stated that "Waiting for Tonight" became one of the "turn-of-the-millennium" club anthems. Lauren Zupkus of The Huffington Post praised it as an "epic dance hit", which was the "perfect anthem for all of our anxiety about Y2K". Los Angeles Times writer Gerrick D. Kennedy stated that "we can all admit that 'Waiting for Tonight' played at our respective millennium celebrations." Dee Lockett, writing for the Chicago Tribune, stated that songs such as "Waiting for Tonight" made Lopez "arguably the leading artist in the dance-pop movement at the time". Andrew Barker of Variety magazine called the song her "breakout club hit", and wrote that it "seemed to anticipate the rise of Euro-centric dance pop.

Although the song is not actually about the then-upcoming millennium and the year 2000, but instead about Lopez anticipating spending time with her lover, thus she's "waiting for tonight", marketing by the record label, as well as the music video funded by the label, tied the song to the new millennium instead. Stacy Lambe of VH1 stated the song quickly became a staple for Lopez. It simultaneously built up the excitement for the New Year while kissing off the fears and drama of the past. It was 1999 after all, and anything could happen." Nick Murray of Rolling Stone described it as "music worth getting lost in". In 2017, BuzzFeed listed the song at number 50 in their list of "The 101 Greatest Dance Songs Of the '90s". In 2018, Rolling Stone ranked "Waiting for Tonight" at number thirty on a list of "50 Greatest Latin Pop Songs", with Suzy Exposito writing: "A reflection of her own experience as a Puerto Rican in the mainland – a perspective shared by many Latinx people living in the United States – 'Waiting for Tonight' pays a soft tribute to the island sounds that raised her, while dominating dance charts around the world and cracking Top Ten on the Billboard Hot 100. Lopez was part of a 1990s Latin "explosion" that saw Latin artists having more mainstream success, that would later include Selena Gomez in the 2000s, just as Gloria Estefan and the Miami Sound Machine, and Lisa Lisa and Cult Jam helped paved the way starting in the 1980s." In 2019, Billboard ranked "Waiting for Tonight" as the ninth greatest song of 1999, stating "its themes are universal, the music is infectious, and the chorus remains timeless (...) If 'Tonight' premiered today, it would still be a smash."

David Browne of Entertainment Weekly was critical of the album On the 6, but he felt that "Waiting for Tonight" stood out among the album's tracks. Richard Harrington from The Washington Post was unfavorable of the song, calling it a "generic" dance track. Deseret News described Lopez's vocals as sultry but thin in songs such as "Waiting for Tonight". Sal Cinquemani of Slant Magazine observed that Lopez's vocals were best-suited for dance-pop songs such as "Waiting for Tonight" and not much other material. AllMusic's Heather Phares praised the Spanish version of the song, "Una Noche Más", for elevating its parent album On the 6 from a star's vanity project. Lopez earned a Grammy Award nomination for "Waiting for Tonight" for Best Dance Recording at the 42nd Annual Grammy Awards, but the category was won by Cher for "Believe".

== Release and chart performance ==
"Waiting for Tonight" served as the third single from On the 6. The track was released on October 27, 1999, in Austria, and five days later in the United Kingdom. It peaked at number five on the UK Singles Chart, and had sold 255,000 copies there by July 2016. It debuted and peaked at number two in Spain, where it spent twelve weeks charting in the top ten. The song reached number six in Italy, and charted at number seven on the Single Top 100 chart in the Netherlands. In Belgium, the song peaked at number four in Wallonia and fifteen in Flanders. It was certified gold in Belgium for shipments of 25,000 units. In Finland, "Waiting for Tonight" charted for three weeks, peaking at number eight. The single also peaked at number ten in France, and was later certified gold in France by the Syndicat National de l'Édition Phonographique, marking shipments of 250,000 units and becoming her second Gold certification in the country, after "If You Had My Love" . Elsewhere, it reached the top fifteen in Norway, Scotland, Switzerland, Ireland, and Germany (where it also reached the top of the airplay charts). The single peaked at number sixteen in Sweden, and reached the top thirty in Austria (number twenty-four).

"Waiting for Tonight" debuted on the Australian Singles Chart at number 35 on October 31, 1999. In its eleventh week on the chart, it reached a peak of number four. Overall, it spent six weeks in the top ten and was certified platinum by the Australian Recording Industry Association for shipments of 70,000 units. After entering the Official New Zealand Music Chart at number 42 for the week ending October 31, 1999, the song peaked at number five one month later, and was later certified gold by the Recording Industry Association of New Zealand for shipment of 7,500 units.

For the week ending October 16, 1999, "Waiting for Tonight" entered the US Billboard Hot 100 at number 56 as the "Hot Shot Debut of the Week." Airplay increased, with the song steadily rising to number 37 in its second week, garnering the "Greatest Gainer in Airplay" title. In its third week, it jumped to number 25 on the Hot 100, while topping the Billboard Dance Club Play chart. "Waiting for Tonight" entered the top ten of the Hot 100 on the week ending November 27, 1999, reaching number nine. The following week, the song peaked at number eight on the Hot 100, on the chart dated December 4, 1999. It is her ninth-most-successful song on Billboard charts. "Waiting for Tonight" was one of four songs that reached the top ten of the Billboard Hot 100 in 1999 based solely on radio play. The song was, however, released to retail on a limited basis and sold 10,000 copies in the United States by January 2000 and was certified Platinum by the Recording Industry Association of America (RIAA) on May 31, 2024. In August 2002, the song received a BDS Certified Spin Award for receiving 200,000 radio spins in the United States. In Canada, "Waiting for Tonight" entered at number 4 before reaching number two for the week of November 29, 1999.

== Music video ==
=== Production ===
The music video for "Waiting for Tonight" was filmed in Los Angeles. Part of it was shot at the Los Angeles Arboretum. Lopez filmed the music video between a break in filming the movie The Cell. The video was directed by Francis Lawrence, whose work Lopez had admired, though for reasons unknown, Lawrence revived an Alan Smithee credit in the release. Although the video has a New Years Eve-theme reflecting the-then upcoming millennium, the lyrics themselves have nothing to do with a New Years celebration. The song is about Lopez being in love and she can't wait to spend time with her boyfriend, thus she's "waiting for tonight". However, when speaking of the video's concept, Lopez said: "I wanted it to be fun and have a certain type of energy and he (Lawrence) came back with the treatment of the video where it was this millennium party in the jungle. Just the way he described it, it sounded perfect, the kind of thing I really wanted to do so we just went with it." When casting extras for the music video, Lopez stressed that she wanted those appearing around her to look like "real people". For the video, she worked with choreographer Tina Landon, who previously had hired Lopez as a backup dancer for Janet Jackson in the early stages of Lopez's career. Landon also made an appearance in the clip as an extra. A second version of the music video featuring the Hex Hector remix of the song was released, later being included on her extended play The Reel Me (2003). The creation of "Waiting for Tonight" was documented and aired by MTV on Making the Video. Cheryl Lu-Lien Tan of The Baltimore Sun stated that it revealed the "death-defying dance stunts" which Lopez undertook, "donning stiletto heels and a micro-mini to perform elaborate footwork on a narrow, 6-foot-high Plexiglas platform while cameras caught her from every possible provocative angle". The music video premiered directly after the Making the Video special on MTV, on August 23, 1999.

=== Synopsis ===
Lopez amid green lasers in "Waiting for Tonight". The utilization of lasers in the clip became a signature look for Lopez and the song.

The clip begins with an image of the sun setting. Lopez and her female friends are at a house preparing for a New Year's Eve party. Inter-cut are scenes of Lopez dancing in a jungle, where green lasers are flashing behind her. Later, another scene features Lopez covered with sparkling crystals on her face and body. Her friends later canoe over a river and travel to a rave party which is being held in a rainforest. Towards the end of the song's bridge, the music briefly stops, as the partygoers stare up at a large clock and count down to the year 2000. There is a six-second power outage (a reference to the Y2K concern). The power returns, and the party celebrates the new year. This is inter-cut with scenes of Lopez dancing on top of the crowd, as well as frolicking in a Hawaiian river wearing a black bikini. The Hex Hector remix version features the same premise of the original clip, while including a variety of different shots, and new scenes of Lopez dancing in a jungle with green lasers flashing behind her. This version also incorporates a strobe effect throughout the music video.

=== Reception ===
The music video was widely popular, receiving heavy rotation on MTV, and establishing Lopez as a "dance princess". According to monitoring by Nielsen Broadcast Data Systems, it was the most-played clip on VH1 for the week ending November 28, 1999. It is known for its thematic depiction of a Y2K dance party. Justin Myers of the Official Charts Company called the video a "chilling reminder of the worldwide fear of the so-called Millennium Bug – Jen looks quite anxious when midnight comes at her very futuristic looking New Year bash, doesn't she?" Author Dominic Pettman observed that the music video captured an "orgasmic anticipation" for the new millennium. Fuse ranked the clip at number 30 on their list of the "Top 100 Sexiest Music Videos of All Time" in 2011. Entertainment Weekly regarded it as the best music video of Lopez's career.

The visuals of "Waiting for Tonight" became distinctive, particularly the green lasers appearing in the background, and the crystals Lopez wore on her body. Lopez said in 2014, "[Green lasers] just became so signature to that song and that time. I think that was the first time anyone had used them in a video that way." In a press release published by Cision in 2014, it was noted that "Lasers in the jungle and the Y2K vibe of that years New Years Eve celebrations are unforgettable images that helped catapult JLO to international success." Maitri Mehta of Bustle magazine wrote that she was "mesmerized by a vision of a bronze J. Lo gettin' life from those green lasers. In almost all of her music videos, J. Lo is extremely, overtly sexy but that's the point." American Idol alumnus Adam Lambert revealed, "I remember when I was a kid graduating high school and 'Waiting for Tonight' came out (...) And she had all the rhinestones on her face and she just looked like just dewy and stunning and amazing." Diane Cho of VH1 noted that Lopez "trademarked" the glitter-look in "Waiting for Tonight", which was adapted by Britney Spears in "Toxic" and Beyoncé in "1+1".

Monica Herrera of Billboard stated that Adam Lambert's music video for the song "If I Had You" took the "late-night wilderness party motif of Jennifer Lopez's classic 'Waiting for Tonight' clip" and added "more lasers, guyliner, thrashy dance moves, silver top hats and outrageously spiky shoulder pads". MTV's Nicole James compared Rihanna's "Where Have You Been" music video to "Waiting for Tonight". Tiffany Lee of Yahoo! stated that Selena Gomez was "channeling" an early Lopez in her song "Slow Down", drawing comparisons between both songs and videos, observing that "the premise for both music videos are almost identical", with "dancing in front of flashing lights and sweating in dance floor crowds". Pitchfork's Lindsay Zoladz stated that English singer FKA twigs' music video for the song "Papi Pacify" features "perhaps the most dazzling use of body glitter in a music video since J. Lo's 'Waiting for Tonight'". Natasha Bird of Elle magazine compared the music video for Zayn Malik's "Like I Would" to "Waiting for Tonight", writing: "with the addition of all the smoke, lasers and gyrating girls in booty shorts, we can't help but think that this video is an excellent tribute to Jennifer Lopez's millennium party single".

The music video received several award nominations, including three wins. At the 2000 MTV Video Music Awards, "Waiting for Tonight" was nominated in the Best Choreography and Best Dance Video categories, winning for Best Dance Video. It also won for Best Dance Video at the International Dance Music Awards. At the 1999 Billboard Music Video Awards, "Waiting for Tonight" received two nominations for Best Video and Best New-Artist Video. It received multiple MVPA Award nominations, including for Pop Video of the Year, and won for Best Hair.

== Live performances ==
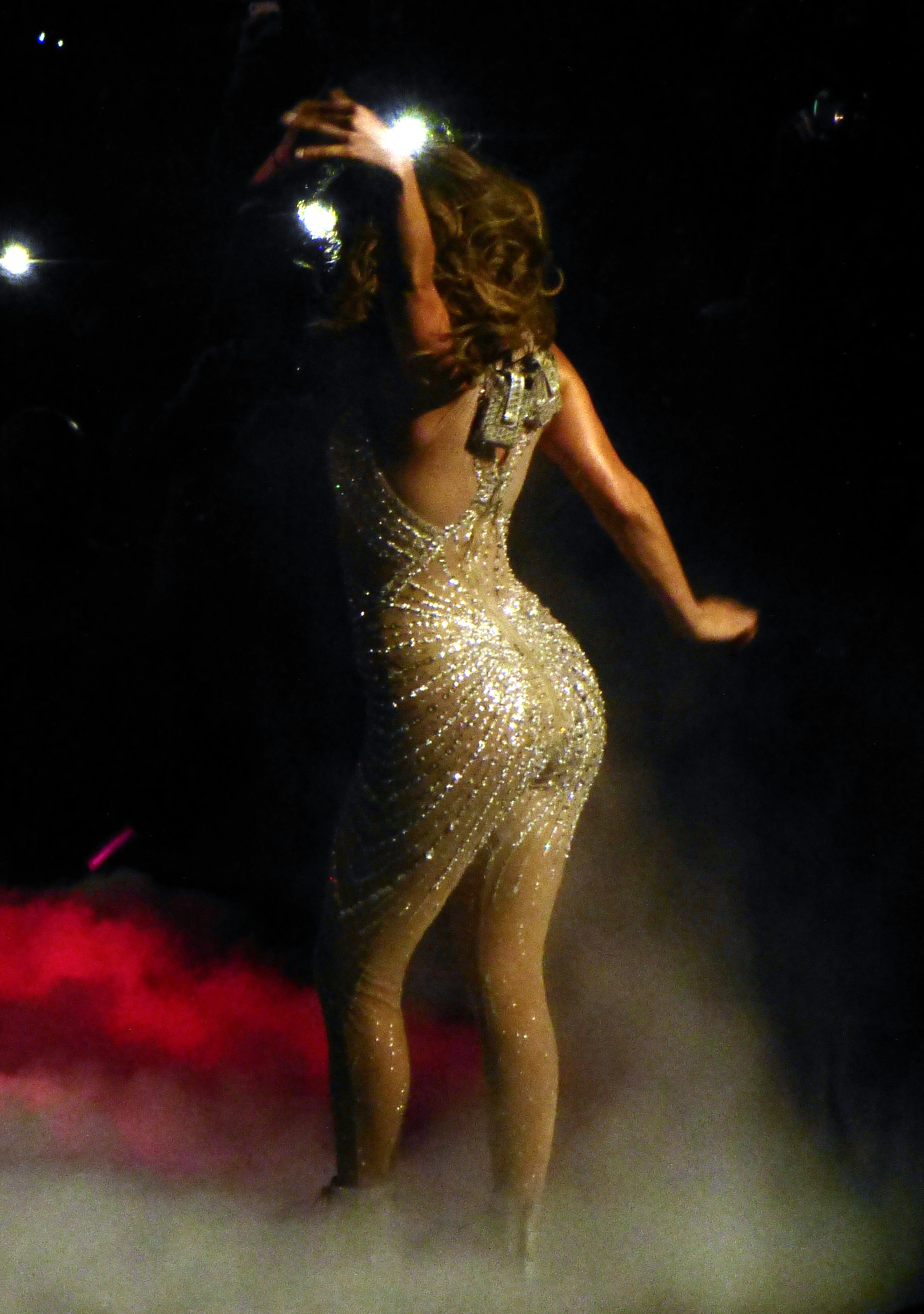
Lopez performing the song during her Dance Again World Tour in 2012

Lopez performed "Waiting for Tonight" for the first time on the British music chart television program Top of the Pops, on the episode that aired November 12, 1999, on BBC One. Weeks later, she performed the song at the 1999 Billboard Music Awards on December 8, 1999, where she opened the show. Billboard praised the performance as a "galvanizing" opening to the ceremony. She also sang the song along with "Feelin' So Good" during an appearance on Saturday Night Live on February 5, 2000. The song was included on the setlist of her Let's Get Loud Concerts in Puerto Rico, a performance in which she got down on "all fours" while singing. The performance was televised on NBC on November 20, 2001.

Lopez performed a remixed version of the song at the charity fundraiser event Fashion Rocks, along with the single "Do It Well". The performance was broadcast by CBS on September 7, 2007. Newsday writer Glenn Gamboa stated that it "seemed built for the runway with all the wind machines and strutting models". Lopez included "Waiting for Tonight" on her set list during her 2007 co-headlining concert tour with then-husband Marc Anthony. Frank Scheck of The Hollywood Reporter described her set as "Heavily choreographed, lavishly costumed and featuring the requisite pyrotechnics and video self-homage." In 2009, Lopez performed it at Dick Clark's New Year's Rockin' Eve in a revealing catsuit. The catsuit provoked a mixed reaction from the public; The host of the show Ryan Seacrest praised the outfit, saying that it "made my year", but others were not so admiring. Alicia Lundgren, a 24-year-old dancer from Philadelphia, told the New York Daily News: "There's too many wrinkles. It looks like elephant skin." Months later in February 2010, Lopez performed "Waiting for Tonight" as part of a medley of her songs—a set that included "Jenny from the Block", "Love Don't Cost a Thing", "Get Right" and "Let's Get Loud"—at the Sanremo Music Festival, wearing a "skintight, studded leather black catsuit". At the Summertime Ball festival hosted by Capital Radio at Wembley Stadium on June 12, 2011, Lopez performed "Waiting for Tonight" among other songs.

Lopez wore a glittery bodysuit for her performance of the song at Mohegan Sun's 15th anniversary celebration concert. It featured dancers that "whirled" around the singer while green lasers swept across the arena ceiling. "Waiting for Tonight" was included on the setlist for her Dance Again World Tour in 2012. She performed the song while dancing on a white moving platform. During the tour's European leg at a concert in Italy, Lopez supposedly had a wardrobe malfunction according to various sources during her performance of "Waiting for Tonight". She was wearing a "plunging skintight cat suit". Lopez performed the track along with several other songs during a July 2013 concert in Hyde Park, London. In March 2014, she sang "Waiting for Tonight" during her concert at the Dubai World Cup. In June of that year, Lopez performed the song during a concert in The Bronx which marked fifteen years since the release of On the 6. Andrew Hampp from Billboard wrote that the "laser-drenched" performance reached "World Cup levels of euphoria for a large swath of fans". Three months later, she performed the song again at the 2014 Singapore Grand Prix, as part of a 90-minute set. Along with her debut single "If You Had My Love", "Waiting for Tonight" was given "a bass-heavy remix that added to the arena rock atmosphere" according to The Straits Times.

At her The Best Is Yet To Come concert which took place on New Year's Eve 2014 in Caesars Palace, Lopez included "Waiting for Tonight" on her setlist; during the performance, she wore a red-sequined costume and performed a striptease on a couch. Lopez opened her performance at the American Music Awards of 2015 (where she also hosted the ceremony) with a "slower, sultrier" rendition of "Waiting for Tonight". She was clothed in a tribal-print body stocking. At her Las Vegas residency show Jennifer Lopez: All I Have in 2016, Lopez performed a reworked "hyper-futuristic" EDM and house version of "Waiting for Tonight", which included "fierce" voguing. Lopez opened her performance at the 2018 MTV Video Music Awards, where she received the Michael Jackson Video Vanguard Award, with "Waiting for Tonight". Kenzie Bryant of Vanity Fair described the set design during the song as "so leafy and green and neon it was reminiscent of her Versace Grammys dress", and Billboard ranked Lopez's performance as the best of the night. The song was featured in Lopez's setlist during the 2020 Super Bowl LIV halftime show.

== Usage in media ==
During Lopez's guest appearance on "I Do, Oh, No, You Di-in't", from the sixth season of the NBC sitcom Will & Grace, she performed "Waiting for Tonight". The episode aired on April 29, 2004, as the season's finale. On the seventh season of the competitive dance series America's Best Dance Crew in May 2012, the group Fanny Pak performed a routine to "Waiting for Tonight". In March 2016, Lopez appeared with James Corden on the Carpool Karaoke segment of his The Late Late Show with James Corden, where she "teaches Corden how to vamp for the camera" as "Waiting for Tonight" plays. That May, Christina Milian recreated the song's music video on an episode of the reality competition series Lip Sync Battle. In March 2019, the Hex Hector remix was used as a lip sync song on the eleventh season of RuPaul's Drag Race, with six contestants lip syncing at the same time for the first time in the show's history. That September, actress Constance Wu performed "Waiting for Tonight" on an episode of The Late Late Show with James Corden. In March 2024, Ariana Grande and Bowen Yang briefly performed "Waiting for Tonight" among other songs as part of a sketch on Saturday Night Live.

== Formats and track listings ==
- Cassette single
1. "Waiting for Tonight" (Album Version) – 4:06
2. "Waiting for Tonight" (Metro Mix) – 5:53
- German CD single
1. "Waiting for Tonight" (Album Version) – 4:06
2. "Waiting for Tonight" (Pablo's Miami Mix Radio Edit) [Spanish and English] – 3:59
- Australian CD maxi single
1. "Waiting for Tonight" (Album Version) – 4:06
2. "Waiting for Tonight" (Pablo's Miami Mix Radio Edit) – 3:59
3. "Waiting for Tonight" (Hex's Momentous Radio Mix) – 3:52
4. "If You Had My Love" (Metro Club Mix) – 6:09
- German CD maxi single
1. "Waiting for Tonight" (Album Version) – 4:06
2. "Waiting for Tonight" (Pablo's Miami Mix Radio Edit) [Spanish and English] – 3:59
3. "Waiting for Tonight" (Hex's Momentous Radio Mix) – 3:52
4. "Waiting for Tonight" (Metro Mix) – 5:53
- UK CD maxi single 1
1. "Waiting for Tonight" – 4:06
2. "Waiting for Tonight" (Hex's Momentous Radio Mix) – 3:52
3. "Waiting for Tonight" (Futureshock Midnight at Mambo Remix) – 8:36
- UK CD maxi single 2
1. "Waiting for Tonight" – 4:06
2. "Waiting for Tonight" (Metro Mix) – 5:53
3. "Waiting for Tonight" (Pablo's Miami Mix Radio Edit) – 4:01
- Australian CD maxi single (The Remixes)
1. "Waiting for Tonight" (Hex Hector Vocal Remix Extended) – 11:15
2. "Waiting for Tonight" (Hex Hector Dub) – 6:31
3. "Waiting for Tonight" (Metro Club Mix) – 5:54
4. "Waiting for Tonight" (Pablo Flores Miami Mix) [English] – 10:01
5. "Waiting for Tonight" (Hex's Momentous Video Remix) – 4:34
- Australian and European 12-inch vinyl
1. "Waiting for Tonight" (Metro Mix) – 5:53
2. "Waiting for Tonight" (Pablo's Miami Mix Spanglish Radio Edit) [Spanish and English] – 3:59
3. "Waiting for Tonight" (Futureshock Midnight at Mambo Remix) – 8:36
4. "Waiting for Tonight" (Hex's Momentous Club Mix) – 11:17
- US 12-inch vinyl
1. "Waiting for Tonight" (Hex's Momentous Club Mix) – 11:15
2. "Waiting for Tonight" (Pablo Flores Spanglish Miami Radio Edit) – 3:56
3. "Waiting for Tonight" (Pablo Flores Miami Mix) – 10:00
4. "Waiting for Tonight" (Hex's Momentous Video Edit) – 4:50

== Credits and personnel ==
Credits adapted from the liner notes of On the 6.

"Waiting for Tonight"

- David Barrett – production coordinator
- Jane Barrett – background vocals
- Juan Bohorquez – assistant engineer
- Maria Christensen – background vocals, songwriter
- Margaret Dorn – background vocals
- Michael Garvin – songwriter
- Franklyn Grant – engineer
- Dan Hetzel – mixer
- Ritchie Jones – additional producer, additional programmer, arranger, drums, remixer, percussion
- Eric Kupper – keyboards
- Jennifer Lopez – lead vocals
- Phil Temple – songwriter
- "Young" Dave Scheuer – additional programmer, additional arranger, engineer
- Ric Wake – arranger, producer
- Robb Williams – assistant engineer
- Thomas R. Yezzi – engineer

"Una Noche Más"

- David Barrett – production coordinator
- Manny Benito – adapter, songwriter
- Juan Bohorquez – assistant engineer
- Maria Christensen – songwriter
- Alfred Figueroa – assistant engineer
- Michael Garvin – songwriter
- Franklyn Grant – engineer
- Dan Hetzel – mixer
- Ritchie Jones – additional producer, additional programmer, arranger, drums, remixer, percussion
- Eric Kupper – keyboards
- Jennifer Lopez – lead vocals
- Phil Temple – songwriter
- Wendy Peterson – background vocals
- Freddy Piñero Jr. – engineer
- Rita Quintero – background vocals
- "Young" Dave Scheuer – additional programmer, additional arranger, engineer
- Ric Wake – arranger, producer
- Robb Williams – assistant engineer
- Thomas R. Yezzi – engineer

== Accolades ==
Accolades for "Waiting for Tonight"
Year	Awards	Category	Result	Ref.
1999	Billboard Music Video Awards	Best Video	Nominated	
1999	Billboard Music Video Awards	Best New Artist Video	Nominated	
1999	SESAC Music Awards	Performance Winner	Won	
2000	Grammy Awards	Best Dance Recording	Nominated	
2000	International Dance Music Awards	Best Dance Video	Won	
2000	MTV Video Music Awards	Best Dance Video	Won	
2000	MTV Video Music Awards	Best Choreography in a Video	Nominated	
2000	Music Video Production Association (MVPA) Awards	Pop Video of the Year	Nominated	
2000	Music Video Production Association (MVPA) Awards	Best Hair	Won	
2000	My VH1 Music Awards	Sexxxiest Video	Nominated	

== Charts ==
=== Weekly charts ===
Weekly chart performance for "Waiting for Tonight"
Chart (1999–2000)	Peak position
Australia (ARIA)	4
Austria (Ö3 Austria Top 40)	24
Belgium (Ultratop 50 Flanders)	15
Belgium (Ultratop 50 Wallonia)	4
Canada Top Singles (RPM)	2
Canada Adult Contemporary (RPM)	17
Canada Dance/Urban (RPM)	1
Canada CHR (Nielsen BDS)	1
Czech Republic (IFPI)	11
Denmark (IFPI)	7
European Hot 100 Singles (Music & Media)	5
Finland (Suomen virallinen lista)	8
France (SNEP)	10
Germany (GfK)	15
Greece (IFPI)	5
Hungary (Mahasz)	2
Iceland (Íslenski Listinn Topp 40)	9
Ireland (IRMA)	13
Italy (FIMI)	7
Italy Airplay (Music & Media)	1
Netherlands (Dutch Top 40)	5
Netherlands (Single Top 100)	7
New Zealand (Recorded Music NZ)	5
Norway (VG-lista)	11
Scottish Singles Sales (Official Charts)	13
Spain (Promusicae)	2
Sweden (Sverigetopplistan)	16
Switzerland (Schweizer Hitparade)	14
UK Singles (Official Charts)	5
US Billboard Hot 100	8
US Dance Club Songs (Billboard)	1
US Dance Singles Sales (Billboard)	6
US Pop Airplay (Billboard)	3
US Rhythmic Airplay (Billboard)	7

Weekly chart performance for "Una Noche Más"
Chart (1999–2020)	Peak position
Nicaragua (Notimex)	3
US Latin Digital Song Sales (Billboard)	5

Weekly chart performance for "Waiting for Tonight (Fisher remix)"
Chart (2024–2025)	Peak position
Hungary (Dance Top 40)	8
Hungary (Rádiós Top 40)	3
New Zealand (Hot 40 Singles)	35

=== Year-end charts ===
1999 year-end chart performance for "Waiting for Tonight"
Chart (1999)	Position
Australia (ARIA)	32
Belgium (Ultratop 50 Wallonia)	48
Canada Top Singles (RPM)	45
European Hot 100 Singles (Music & Media)	60
France (SNEP)	84
Netherlands (Dutch Top 40)	71
New Zealand (RIANZ)	34
Romania (Romanian Top 100)	67
Spain (AFYVE)	19
UK Singles (OCC)	97
UK Airplay (Music Week)	38
US Dance Club Play (Billboard)	37
US Mainstream Top 40 (Billboard)	70
US Rhythmic Top 40 (Billboard)	73

2000 year-end chart performance for "Waiting for Tonight"
Chart (2000)	Position
US Billboard Hot 100	99
US Mainstream Top 40 (Billboard)	45
US Rhythmic Top 40 (Billboard)	60

2025 year-end chart performance for "Waiting for Tonight (Fisher remix)"
Chart (2025)	Position
Hungary (Dance Top 40)	32
Hungary (Rádiós Top 40)	13

== Certifications ==
Certifications and sales for "Waiting for Tonight"
Region	Certification	Certified units/sales
Australia (ARIA)	2× Platinum	140,000^{‡}
Belgium (BRMA)	Gold	25,000^{*}
France (SNEP)	Gold	250,000^{*}
New Zealand (RMNZ)	Gold	5,000^{*}
New Zealand (RMNZ) digital	Gold	15,000^{‡}
United Kingdom (BPI)	Platinum	600,000^{‡}
United States (RIAA)	Platinum	1,000,000^{‡}
^{*} Sales figures based on certification alone.^{‡} Sales+streaming figures based on certification alone.

== Release history ==
Release dates and formats for "Waiting for Tonight"
Region	Date	Format(s)	Label(s)	Ref.
United States	September 7, 1999	Contemporary hit radio; rhythmic contemporary radio	Work; Epic	
United States	October 19, 1999	12-inch single	Work	
Belgium	October 25, 1999	Maxi CD	Sony Music	
United Kingdom	November 1, 1999	CD single; cassette single	Columbia	

== See also ==
- List of European number-one airplay songs of the 1990s
- List of number-one dance singles of 1999 (U.S.)
- List of number-one dance singles of 1999 (Canada)
