= On the 6 =

Studio album by Jennifer Lopez
- Released: June 1, 1999
- Recorded: 1998–1999
- Studios: Sony Music (New York, NY); The Hit Factory (New York, NY); Daddy's House Recording Studios (New York, NY); Crescent Moon Studios (Miami, FL); Cove City Sound Studios (Glen Cove, NY); Wallyworld (San Rafael, CA); Andora Studios (Hollywood, CA); Capitol Studios (Los Angeles, CA); The Enterprise (Burbank, CA)
- Genres: Pop; Latin; R&B
- Length: 64:13
- Languages: English; Spanish
- Label: Work
- Producers: Randall Barlow; Darrell "Digga" Branch; Sean "Puffy" Combs; Loren Dawson; Lawrence P. Dermer; Emilio Estefan Jr.; Rodney Jerkins; George Noriega; Poke and Tone; Lance "Un" Rivera; Cory Rooney; Kike Santander; Dan Shea; Ric Wake; Alvin West

Jennifer Lopez chronology
On the 6 (1999)	J.Lo (2001)

Singles from On the 6
- 1. "If You Had My Love" Released: May 4, 1999; 2. "No Me Ames" Released: May 11, 1999; 3. "Waiting for Tonight" Released: September 7, 1999; 4. "Feelin' So Good" Released: January 25, 2000; 5. "Let's Get Loud" Released: June 13, 2000

On the 6 is the debut studio album by American singer and actress Jennifer Lopez. It was released on June 1, 1999, by the Work Group. Lopez worked with several producers on the album, including Rodney Jerkins, Cory Rooney, Dan Shea and her boyfriend at the time, rapper and record producer Sean "Puffy" Combs.

Critics greeted Lopez's musical debut with a generally positive response. On the 6 was praised for its conservative, though dynamic, musical style and combination of Latin with pop and R&B. Critics commented on Lopez's vocal ability and many generally gave good remarks for her versatility and somewhat "seductive" and "sultry" singing, however, some critics found the vocals quite underwhelming. The album was successful on the charts, reaching the top ten or top twenty in the US and several other countries around the world. On the 6 was certified triple platinum by the Recording Industry Association of America (RIAA) for shipments of three million copies in the US.

The album produced five singles, three of which hit the main US Billboard Hot 100 chart. "If You Had My Love" topped the Hot 100, while "Waiting for Tonight" peaked at number eight. "No Me Ames", a ballad with Lopez's then-future, now ex-husband, Marc Anthony, was ineligible for the Hot 100, but was a hit on Billboard's Latin chart. "Feelin' So Good" hit number 51 in the US, and peaked at number one on the US Dance Club Songs chart. A fifth and final single, "Let's Get Loud" did not chart on the Hot 100 due to the lack of a physical release in the US, but became a major hit in several other countries.

With On the 6, Lopez was credited with helping drive what was termed the "Latin explosion" in Western popular music. A Spanish edition of the album was released in November 1999. This version of the album shuffles the track list, omitting "Feelin' So Good" and spawning an all-new Spanish track ("Es Amor"), as well as Spanish versions of songs from the original album. Lopez surprise-released a 25th anniversary digital-only reissue on May 31, 2024.

== Background ==
The idea to do an album is not a gimmick. It wasn't, 'Oh, I'm doing good as an actress, maybe I should make an album!' I had a record deal [with Giant Records] before my movie career, luckily enough, took off [...] When I did Selena it all came back again, having that interaction with the fans and the public, which you don't get in movies. I missed that very much. I missed the excitement of the stage, which I had early in my career with the musical theater.

— Lopez on her decision to begin a music career.

Since her childhood, Lopez's Puerto Rican parents stressed the importance of a good work ethic and the ability to speak English. They encouraged their three daughters to put on performances at home, singing and dancing in front of each other and their friends so they would stay out of trouble. During her final year of high school, Lopez learned about a casting call for several teenage girls for small film roles. She auditioned and was cast in My Little Girl (1986), a low-budget film co-written and directed by Connie Kaiserman. After filming her role, Lopez knew that she wanted to become a "famous movie star". She told her parents, but they told her it was a "really stupid" idea and "no Latinos did that". Her disagreement with them led Lopez to move out of her family home and into a Manhattan apartment. During this period, Lopez performed in regional productions of several musicals before being hired for the chorus in a musical which toured Europe for five months. She was unhappy with the role, since she was the only member of the chorus not to have a solo. She got a job on the Japanese show Synchronicity as a dancer, singer and choreographer. Lopez then obtained her first high-profile job as a Fly Girl dancer on the television comedy program In Living Color. She moved to Los Angeles with then-boyfriend David Cruz to film the series, and remained a cast member until 1993 (when she decided to pursue a full-time acting career).

After a series of co-starring film roles, Lopez received her big break in 1996 when she was cast in the title role of Selena, a biographical film about American singer-songwriter Selena Quintanilla-Pérez. In the film Selena's voice is used for the musical sequences, but Lopez would sing the lyrics instead of lip syncing. When asked in an interview if Selena inspired her to launch a music career, Lopez said "I really, really became inspired, because I started my career in musical theater on stage. So doing the movie just reminded me of how much I missed singing, dancing, and the like..." After filming Selena, Lopez was "really feeling [her] Latin roots" and recorded a demo record in Spanish. Lopez' manager sent the song ("Vivir Sin Ti") to Sony Music Entertainment's Work Group, which was interested in signing Lopez. Tommy Mottola, the head of the label, suggested that she sing in English and she began recording On the 6. Lopez was aware that she received her recording contract on her looks and reputation, and wanted to prove that she had musical talent. Before her first album, critics wondered why she would take the risk of launching a musical career: "If the album was a flop, not only would it embarrass Lopez but it might even damage her career."

== Recording ==
For On the 6, Mottola and Lopez met with several producers, but producer and writer Cory Rooney later recalled that when he met Lopez, they "immediately hit it off". He played piano and sang "Talk About Us" for them, which Mottola and Lopez liked; she recorded it the next day, and worked closely with Rooney on the rest of the album. Other contributors to On the 6 included then-boyfriend Sean "Puffy" Combs, future husband Marc Anthony, Rodney "Darkchild" Jerkins, Poke & Tone and the husband-and-wife team of Emilio and Gloria Estefan. Grammy Award-winning singer and vocal producer Betty Wright, known for her hit "Clean Up Woman" (1971), worked closely with Lopez on the album and provided her with "plenty of inspiration". Lopez said Wright had "an amazing spirit": "She was in [the studio] with me, day in and day out, helping me. I'm a young singer, you know? A young studio singer. I may have sang all my life, and I may have sang on stage and stuff like that, but it's different to record in the studio. And you need somebody who really can guide you through that."

One day, whilst working on On the 6, Jennifer Lopez "happened to be" recording at the same recording studio where American recording artist Marc Anthony was recording. Anthony, who had become intrigued by Lopez after seeing her in Selena (1997), came into her studio and asked her to appear in the music video for his song "No Me Conoces". She agreed, but only if he recorded a song with her, to which he in turn agreed. Lopez recalled the events on her Feelin' So Good video album by stating: "So at that time I called Tommy [Mottola] and I'm like 'Look, so Marc Anthony said he would do a song and I really don't want to do a duet with just anybody, I want to do a duet with him. So can you force him to sign something, so he has to do a record with me? If I do this video!'" The two first shot the video and then began working on the song.

"Let's Get Loud" was originally written for Gloria Estefan, but she felt as if the song was too similar to her previous recordings. She then passed the song to Lopez, stating that she would have "more fun with it" and would put "a new spin" on it. Lopez felt that recording her first album was "worlds apart" from being a film actress in Hollywood: "The movie business is so structured with time frames and such. But the music business is so loose, you can come in whenever you want". She hoped On the 6 would appeal to people like her: "English is my first language. I grew up here. I was born here, I didn't have a career in Spanish first. I think it [the album] appeals definitely to my generation of people, we grew up in America but had Latin parents or parents of different ethnicity." She wanted the album to reflect both sides of her, regarding Hispanic people as her "core audience".

== Music and lyrics ==
On the 6 primarily consists of R&B and Latin music, which Lopez called eclectic Latin soul. Although she described herself as bilingual and the record has Latin influences, Lopez chose to sing in English. The Los Angeles Times described the album as not only Latin soul, but "state-of-the-art dance pop". Lopez said, "The whole vibe of the album is R&B and Latin music. It has both those influences...It still has a pop feel to it, but I definitely wanted to mix the two because I feel that [is] very much who I am, growing up in the Bronx, being of Latin descent". The album incorporates different parts of Lopez's life and upbringing and marked the beginning of her musical exploration of love, a theme she continued in future albums.

"If You Had My Love" is a slow-paced mid-tempo pop and R&B song in B♭ minor, with piano and guitar instrumentation. On the track Lopez establishes a number of "ground rules" for her admirer before giving herself to him: "Now if I gave you me, this is how it's got to be/ First of all I won't take you cheatin' on me/ Tell me who can I trust if I can't trust in you/ And I refuse to let you play me for a fool". "Let's Get Loud" is a "fiery, soulful" salsa dance song originally written for Gloria Estefan, who gave it to Lopez (who, she felt, would have more fun with it). Lopez asserts her Latin heritage in the song, which opens with the "sassy" declaration "Ya Jen llego, presente!" ("Jen has arrived!"). "Feelin' So Good", a mid-tempo hip-hop song featuring Big Pun and Fat Joe, samples Strafe's "Set It Off". Lopez sings about feeling so good and declares that "Nothing in this world could turn me around", as Big Pun shouts "Jenny, you da bomb!" "Waiting for Tonight" is a dance song highlighting the album's "upbeat side" with a distinctive Latin feel. Aaron Beierle of DVD Talk said the song has a "rich groove", while Entertainment Weekly's David Browne described it as "club-hopping".

Lyrically, several soft ballads on the record have Lopez portraying a woman who is heartbroken. "No Me Ames" is sung by Lopez and Marc Anthony, who became her third husband several years after the album's release. The ballad (which Lopez didn't want to sound "too Latin") is described as "smoldering". A tropical version of "No Me Ames" was included; Heather Phares of AllMusic said that the remix "emphasizes Lopez's distinctive heritage". "Open Off My Love" is one of the album's upbeat songs and is inspired by R&B Latin; the arrangement includes horns, keyboards and percussion. It contains a sample of Grupo Africando's song "Yay Boy" and has several sexual innuendoes, with lyrics such as "When I touch, you get hot" and "Touch you in that place you like/ You'll be open off my love". "Should Have Never" is one of the album's "smooth" ballads, in which Lopez sings about regret. About writing "Should've Never", Lopez said "I would listen to it and listen to it, and then I was like, "I have an idea of what I want to write about: when you're with somebody, and somebody else comes into your life, and even though you love this person, somebody else is there...". The song concludes with a "Spanish moan". On the 6 features several other ballads, including "Too Late" and the "flamenco-flavored", bittersweet "Could This Be Love". Lopez shows her vulnerable side on "Talk About Us" and "Promise Me You'll Try".

== Singles ==
"If You Had My Love", Lopez's debut single, was released as the lead single from On the 6 on May 4, 1999. Produced by Rodney Jerkins, LaShawn Daniels, Fred Jenkins III and Cory Rooney, the single was an instant hit (reaching number one in the United States). It was also an international success, reaching number one in Australia, New Zealand, Finland and other countries; it reached the top ten in over ten countries. Reflecting on the song's success in the United States, Lopez said "Still I think about that and still it's like wow, my first record I ever did went to No. 1. It's just an overwhelming feeling... This is a very special thing." A music video for the song, directed by Paul Hunter, caused a stir for its theme of voyeurism and became a fixture on the music video channel MTV. It was well received by critics, with Entertainment Weekly grading it A-minus. "No Me Ames" (with Marc Anthony) was the album's second single. Though it appeared as a B-side single to "If You Had My Love", both songs were promoted to radio ("If You Had My Love" to English-language stations and "No Me Ames" to Spanish-language stations) and "No Me Ames" reached #1 on Billboard's Hot Latin Songs chart.

"Waiting for Tonight", the album's third single, was released on September 7, 1999. Its music video consisted of a New Year's Eve party-theme, relative to the upcoming new millennium that was approaching. The song would become Lopez's second US top ten hit. As the year 2000 approached, it rose on the US Billboard Hot 100, peaking at #8. On January 25, 2000, the single "Feelin' So Good", featuring rappers Big Punisher (Big Pun) and Fat Joe, was released as the album's fourth single. Big Punisher failed to appear on Saturday Night Live, where Lopez and Fat Joe performed the song around the time of its release; it was later announced on MTV that Big Pun had died of a heart attack related to his weight. Lopez later issued a statement regarding his death: "He was a source of pride for the Latin community, a great artist and a great person. We will miss him terribly". "Feelin' So Good" cracked the Hot 100, peaking at #51, and its music video received heavy rotation on MTV and BET. The video featured Lopez and her girlfriends headed out for a night on the town at a local club, where they run into Fat Joe and Big Pun, both of whom are vying for Lopez's affection. In June 2000, the album's fifth and final single, "Let's Get Loud", was released. Although it was not released in the US, "Let's Get Loud" did become a hit in several international markets.

== Release and promotion ==
I've done so many interviews cause I wanted everybody to know how I felt about it; how this was not something that was a win for me and that it wasn't something that was a gimmick or that I felt like, you know, "oh I'm just gonna do it and see what happens". No, this has always been a part of me since I was very young, and that they got to know me as an actress first was a coincidence because I was always gonna do both. It was just a matter of timing.

— Lopez, on the extensive promotion of On the 6

The album's title refers to the 6 subway service in New York City, which Lopez used to ride to and from work in Manhattan as well as her home in the Bronx during her early career. On the day of the album's release, Lopez appeared at the Virgin Megastore in New York City and signed copies of the CD for fans. On June 4, Lopez appeared at the Wherehouse Entertainment Store at the Beverly Connection in Los Angeles to publicize the album. According to Yahoo! Music, "She will be making a grand red-carpet entrance and signing autographs for the crowd expected for the event". On July 9, Lopez and Ricky Martin appeared on The Oprah Winfrey Show to discuss the "Latin explosion" in the Anglo music market. The next day, she performed at the closing ceremony of the 1999 FIFA Women's World Cup at the Rose Bowl. On August 12, Lopez was a presenter at the Teen Choice Awards. A week later, BET aired a documentary entitled 24 Hours With Jennifer Lopez – From Fly Girl to Major Star. August 23 saw Lopez on MTV's Making the Video (episode 108), where cameras followed her while she filmed the video for "Waiting for Tonight". That October MTV aired a documentary about the entertainer, which retraced her "steps into the spotlight as one of show business's hottest stars" by returning "to her pre-headline days during her childhood in the Bronx, where her dream to perform was first ignited at age five as a ballet and flamenco student". On December 8, 1999, Lopez first performed "Waiting for Tonight" at the Billboard Music Awards at the MGM Grand Garden Arena in Las Vegas, where she opened the show.

On December 27, 1999, Lopez and then-boyfriend, rapper and producer Sean Combs (who co-produced On the 6), were arrested with two others in connection with a shooting outside the Times Square Club in New York. They were charged with criminal possession of a weapon and stolen property. Lopez was soon exonerated; her attorney released a statement that "Jennifer Lopez does not own a firearm nor does she condone the use of firearms", while Combs's publicist said that Lopez "had absolutely, positively nothing to do with this shooting". However, Combs was indicted by a Manhattan grand jury. The controversy was expected to dent On the 6's promotion, but a spokeswoman for Lopez said that was unlikely; the shooting had attracted attention primarily in New York. With the release of "Feelin' So Good" as a single, Lopez dove back into another sea of promotion with several TV interviews at the beginning of 2000. On February 23 Lopez wore a plunging, exotic Green Versace jungle dress to the 42nd Grammy Awards, which overshadowed the shooting and became one of the best-known red-carpet dresses in history. At the 13th Annual Kids' Choice Awards, which aired on April 15, 2000, Lopez performed "Feelin' So Good". On May 2, she again performed "Feelin' So Good" and "Waiting for Tonight" on Saturday Night Live. That November a video album entitled Jennifer Lopez: Feelin' So Good was released by SMV Enterprises, the home-media division of Sony Corporation's music-and-entertainment label Sony Music Entertainment. The album provides a documentary-style look at the launch of Lopez's music career with a mixture of interviews, behind-the-scenes footage, music videos and live performances.

== Critical reception ==
Professional ratings
Review scores
Source	Rating
AllMusic	4/5 stars
Robert Christgau	(choice cut)
Entertainment Weekly	C
Los Angeles Times	2.5/4 stars
NME	3.5/5 stars
Rolling Stone	3/5 stars
Rolling Stone Album Guide	2/5 stars
Sonic.net	1.5/5 stars

On the 6 received positive reviews from contemporary music critics. Elysa Gardner of the Los Angeles Times gave the album a positive review, praising its blend of "urban and Latin textures and grooves with shiny pop savvy" and Lopez' vocals, which she described "as seductively emotive as her work on screen". NME noted, "Millionaire movie star Jennifer Lopez sidles into the music biz and her sultry purr singlehandedly eradicates all public need for the likes of (Whitney) Houston, (Celine) Dion and the rest of the world's favourite shag-anthem divas...Mariah Carey's ongoing quest for cool has just been dealt a severe blow." Rolling Stone's Rob Sheffield gave the album three out of five stars, complimenting Lopez's conservative attitude to her music: "The happy surprise of On the 6 is that she knows what she's doing. Instead of strained vocal pyrotechnics, Lopez sticks to the understated R&B murmur of a round-the-way superstar who doesn't need to belt because she knows you're already paying attention." Sheffield described Lopez as a "song-and-dance woman", who "makes a little va-va and a whole lot of voom go a long way".

AllMusic's Heather Phares was also positive, writing that the album "showcases the actress' sultry, versatile voice in a number of settings." However, Newsday said that "the slick packaging and production are better than Lopez' personal sound". David Browne of Entertainment Weekly gave the album a mixed review, dissatisfied with Lopez' vocals despite the album's rich production: "As soon as Lopez opens her mouth, though, all this advance work falls by the wayside. On record, the husky-voiced voluptuousness that has become Lopez's trademark in films like Out of Sight simply vanishes." Browne felt that while her voice was "thinner" than expected, it was not "embarrassing, but sadly ordinary". Overall, he felt that despite "all of the wads of money spent on fledging" her music career, Lopez comes across as "a little more than a mild Spice Girl". Robert Christgau called "Let's Get Loud" the best song on the album, making it a "choice cut". Aaron Beierle of DVD Talk described On the 6 as a "confident singing debut" because although he did not think Lopez's vocals are "terribly noteworthy", they have a "smooth" and "warm, sensual quality": "The more up-tempo songs have a greater kick than before, with beats that sound deep and dynamic, while ballads are presented with greater clarity and a more open, airy sound."

=== Accolades ===
Accolades for On the 6
Award	Year	Category	Result	Ref.
Premios Globo	1999	Album of the Year	Nominated	
Blockbuster Entertainment Awards	2000	Favorite Female – New Artist	Nominated	
Echo Awards	2000	International Newcomer of the Year	Nominated	
EMMA Awards	2000	Best International Music Act/Production	Nominated	
Premios Amigo	2000	Best International Album	Nominated	
Soul Train Music Awards	2000	Best R&B/Soul Album - Female	Nominated	

== Commercial performance ==
On the 6 was a commercial success, which surprised critics as it was considered a big risk for Lopez. For the week ending June 19, 1999, it debuted at number eight on the Billboard 200, selling 112,000 units during the same week "If You Had My Love" spent its second week at number one on the Billboard Hot 100. The next week the album dropped to number 12, although its lead single remained atop the Hot 100. Its third week saw the album remain at this position. According to Nielsen SoundScan, On the 6 sold almost 400,000 copies during its first four weeks. Throughout July the album performed steadily, remaining in the Billboard 200's top twenty. By August 21 the album had spent ten weeks on the top twenty, while "If You Had My Love" had been in the top ten of the Hot 100 for twelve weeks. By October, On the 6 had sold 1.6 million copies in the United States. After a one-year run on the chart the album fell off by the week of June 3, 2000, after charting at number 173. It re-entered two weeks later at number 179, before dropping to number 186 and falling off the chart the following week. Overall, On the 6 experienced a 53-week run on the Billboard 200. The album also peaked at number eight on Billboard's Top R&B/Hip-Hop Albums chart, and was certified triple platinum by the Recording Industry Association of America for shipments of over three million units. By October 2010 Billboard's Gary Trust reported that the album had sold 2.81 million copies in the United States, making it Lopez's second-bestseller overall. As of 2020, On the 6 has sold a total of 2.9 million copies, according to Nielsen Music/MRC Data.

The album also enjoyed international success, reaching the top ten in a number of countries. In Germany, On the 6 entered the charts on July 19, 1999, at number eight; after two weeks, it peaked at number three. It was certified gold in that country by the Bundesverband Musikindustrie (BVMI) for sales exceeding 250,000 units. The album also peaked at number three (and was certified gold) in Switzerland, where it sold 15,000 copies. In Canada On the 6 peaked at number five, and was certified five times for shipments of over a half-million copies. In Belgium, the album reached number ten in Flanders and number six in Wallonia. On the 6 entered the Dutch album chart at number 55 for the week of July 10, 1999. Nearly a month later, on August 7, it peaked at number six. The album spent a total of 82 weeks charting in the Netherlands, and was certified platinum for sales of 60,000 copies. On the 6 was moderately successful in Australia, where it debuted (and peaked) at number 11 on July 18, 1999. In 2002 it was certified platinum by the Australian Recording Industry Association for selling 70,000 copies. On the 6 peaked at number 14 in the United Kingdom, and was certified platinum by the British Phonographic Industry for sales of over 300,000 copies. The album entered the French album chart at number 24 on July 3, 1999, peaking at number 15 two weeks later. It spent a total of 38 weeks on the chart, and was awarded a double-gold certification by the Syndicat National de l'Édition Phonographique for sales of 210,000 copies. On the 6 had sold 2 million copies worldwide by November 26, 1999; and 5 million by June 2000. The album had sold over 8 million copies worldwide by 2001, and 10 million copies by 2003.

== Legacy ==
=== Cultural impact ===
Bianca Betancourt of i-D magazine described Lopez's success with On the 6 as "unheard of — not only as just a female artist, but as a Puerto Rican girl from the Bronx as well." Critic Gary Suarez said "It was great to see a Latina making hits who wasn’t trying to hide her heritage in the process." With her musical debut, Lopez was credited with helping drive what was termed the "Latin explosion" in Western pop music. This movement saw the popularization of pop music by Hispanic performers during the year 1999. At the time, it was noted that Latin musicians—including Lopez, Ricky Martin, Enrique Iglesias and Marc Anthony—were "creating a stir" in American entertainment. According to The Dallas Morning News, a Latin pop crossover "explosion" and "ethnic boom" was occurring. Brian Haack of The Recording Academy wrote that it was Lopez's performance in Selena that positioned her as "the breakout female star to help propel the Latin pop movement". Since she is of Latin descent and crossed over to the mainstream music market, Lopez is considered "crossover royalty". Mark Guarino of the Daily Herald said of Lopez and her fellow Latin artists, "judging from their records, their cultural identity was identified as cultural baggage by their record companies and those suitcases were shucked en route to stardom".

Lopez and Anthony noted that they wanted the "Latin invasion" and "hype" to die down so they could be viewed as normal artists and "regular people". Anthony asserted that their music "is not Latin music" (although it has Latin influences), but "it isn't representative of what Latin music is": "To stand out because you're Puerto Rican or because you're Latin is really weird." Lopez said, "I don't think Latino is a phase [or] like it's this year's hot thing. Being that you're talking about people, I don't feel that way, really." The Hartford Courant said, "All have conquered mainstream pop charts by toning down the spice of their native salsa and especially by singing in English". Later, Lopez noted: "It's funny that they create a 'movement' thing because three people come out with an album at the same time, or whatever it was. Yes, I'm Latin. Yes, I made an English pop album because I grew up here in the United States. I don't know...It didn't bother me in any way. I didn't think of it as a negative thing, but I also didn't think it was fair to do it because it makes it seem like people are a fad—or a culture is a fad." This "Latin explosion" was showcased in a 2015 HBO documentary titled The Latin Explosion, produced by Mottola; it included a sit-down interview with Lopez among other Latin recording artists.

With On the 6 incorporating diverse musical styles, scholars described Lopez's success as "translocal" and "transatlantic". Licia Fiol-Matta said the album reflected Lopez's diasporality, with Carena Liptake of The Recording Academy observing that she introduced herself "as a proud Nuyorican who used her story to elevate the experience of growing up Latina in the Bronx." The album was noted for its combining of Latin and hip hop influences; Betancourt said Lopez's "juggling of genres" is "a proper representation of the Latinx experience that audiences didn't fully comprehend when she debuted; a showing of how Latinx and Black identity is more alike than they are different."

=== Career transition ===
Six months after the release of On the 6 Lopez had successfully transformed from a movie star into a pop star, joining an "elite circle of actors to venture successfully into the music arena". She became the latest of a small number of stars to achieve this, following Martika and Vanessa Williams (who crossed over during the late 1980s and early 1990s). The provocative music video for the album's lead single ("If You Had My Love") was a hit on MTV channels worldwide, with Lopez popular in a field previously dominated by Madonna and Janet Jackson. "Waiting for Tonight" and its music video created a musical craze in association with the new year, and was a celebratory anthem for the new millennium. In 2013, Andrew Barker of Variety described the single as her "breakout club hit", observing that it "seemed to anticipate the rise of Euro-centric dance pop a decade before EDM became a buzz term" and noting that when DJ culture became a trend Lopez turned away (instead released the Spanish-language Como Ama una Mujer in 2007).

Since the release of On the 6, Lopez has been widely regarded as a triple-threat performer: the most-influential entertainer of Hispanic descent in the United States and a pop culture icon. The Los Angeles Times wrote, "Making the transition from hot actor to singing star is a risky proposition—anyone remember Philip Michael Thomas' musical moment? But Lopez is going about it in a most agreeable way: with a light heart and even lighter feet." Entertainment Weekly, which gave the album a mixed review, said "In the year 2020, this album will be part of someone's doctoral thesis on the dangers of crossover". Lopez has used her film and music career to build a successful empire. In April 2011 CNN wrote, "From Fly Girl on In Living Color to judge on American Idol, she has taken her talent beyond the triple threat of being a dancer, singer and actress and now helms an empire that includes fragrances, a production company, lucrative endorsements and a place once again atop the charts, having sold tens of millions of records over the years". Lopez has sold 75 million records after On the 6, and received a star on the Hollywood Walk of Fame in 2013 for her contribution to the music industry.

== Track listing ==
On the 6 track listing
No.	Title	Lyrics	Music	Production	Length
1.	"If You Had My Love"	Rodney Jerkins; LaShawn Daniels; Cory Rooney; Jennifer Lopez; Fred Jerkins III	Jerkins	Jerkins; Daniels^{[g]}; Rooney^{[g]}	4:25
2.	"Should've Never"	Rooney; Lopez	Samuel Barnes; Jean Claude Olivier; Rooney; Tonino Baliardo^{[a]}; Nicolas Reyes^{[a]}	Poke and Tone; Rooney^{[b]}; Dan Shea^{[b]}	6:14
3.	"Too Late"	Rooney; Lopez	Alvin West	West	4:27
4.	"Feelin' So Good" (featuring Big Pun and Fat Joe)	Rooney; Lopez	Sean "Puffy" Combs; Steven Standard^{[c]}; George Logios^{[c]}	Combs; Rooney	5:27
5.	"Let's Get Loud"	Gloria Estefan; Kike Santander	Estefan; Santander	Emilio Estefan Jr.^{[d]}; Santander	3:59
6.	"Could This Be Love"	Lawrence P. Dermer	Dermer	Estefan Jr.^{[d]}; Dermer	4:26
7.	"No Me Ames" (duet with Marc Anthony) (Tropical Remix)	Giancarlo Bigazzi; Aleandro Baldi; Marco Falagiani; Ignacio Ballesteros^{[e]}	Bigazzi; Baldi; Falagiani	Estefan Jr.^{[f]}; Shea^{[g]}; Juan Vicente Zambrano^{[h]}	5:03
8.	"Waiting for Tonight"	Maria Christensen; Michael Garvin; Phil Temple	Christensen; Garvin; Temple	Ric Wake; Richie Jones^{[i]}	4:06
9.	"Open Off My Love"	Kyra Lawrence	Darrell "Digga" Branch; Lance "Un" Rivera	Branch; Rivera	4:35
10.	"Promise Me You'll Try"	Peter Zizzo	Zizzo	Wake	3:52
11.	"It's Not That Serious"	Rooney; Lopez; Jerkins; Loren Dawson	Jerkins	Jerkins; Dawson; Rooney	4:17
12.	"Talk About Us"	Rooney	Rooney	Rooney; Shea	4:35
13.	"No Me Ames" (duet with Marc Anthony) (Ballad Version)	Bigazzi; Baldi; Falagiani; Ballesteros^{[e]}	Bigazzi; Baldi; Falagiani	Shea	4:38
14.	"Una Noche Mas" (Waiting for Tonight)	Christensen; Garvin; Temple; Manny Benito^{[e]}	Christensen; Garvin; Temple	Wake	4:09
Total length:					64:13

Japanese bonus track
No.	Title	Lyrics	Music	Production	Length
15.	"Theme from Mahogany (Do You Know Where You're Going To)"	Michael Masser; Gerald Goffin	Masser; Goffin	Shea; Rooney	3:34
Total length:					67:35

European edition and digital reissue (bonus tracks)
No.	Title	Lyrics	Music	Production	Length
15.	"Baila" (from the film Music of the Heart)	Estefan Jr.; Jon Secada; Randall Barlow; George Noriega	Estefan Jr.; Secada; Barlow; Noriega	Estefan Jr.; Barlow; Noriega	3:54
16.	"Theme from Mahogany (Do You Know Where You're Going To)"	Masser; Goffin	Masser; Goffin	Shea; Rooney	3:34
Total length:					71:29

European special edition (bonus CD)
No.	Title	Length
1.	"If You Had My Love" (Dark Child Master Mix)	4:25
2.	"If You Had My Love" (Metro Remix)	6:08
3.	"Waiting for Tonight" (Metro Mix)	5:53
4.	"Waiting for Tonight" (Future Shock Midnight at Mambo Mix)	8:36
5.	"Feelin' So Good" (Bad Boy Remix) (featuring Big Pun and Fat Joe)	4:31
Total length:		29:33

Millennium Special Package edition (bonus VCD)
No.	Title	Length
1.	"If You Had My Love" (video)
2.	"Waiting for Tonight" (video)

Spanish edition
No.	Title	Length
1.	"No Me Ames" (duet with Marc Anthony) (Ballad Version)	4:36
2.	"If You Had My Love"	4:26
3.	"Una Noche Más" (Waiting for Tonight)	4:06
4.	"Should've Never"	6:14
5.	"Es Amor"	4:39
6.	"Let's Get Loud"	4:00
7.	"It's Not That Serious"	4:16
8.	"Amar es Para Siempre" (Promise Me You'll Try)	3:52
9.	"Too Late"	4:28
10.	"El Deseo de Tu Amor" (Open Off My Love)	3:36
11.	"Talk About Us"	4:35
12.	"Could This Be Love"	4:26
13.	"No Me Ames" (duet with Marc Anthony) (Tropical Remix)	5:03
Total length:		58:17

Spanish reissue bonus track
No.	Title	Length
14.	"Waiting for Tonight"	4:06
Total length:		62:23

25th anniversary digital reissue (Disc 2)
No.	Title	Length
1.	"Waiting for Tonight" (Remix Radio Edit with FISHER)	3:18
2.	"Waiting for Tonight" (Pessto Remix)	2:57
3.	"Waiting for Tonight" (instrumental)	4:06
4.	"Waiting for Tonight" (a capella)	4:11
5.	"Una Noche Más" (Pablo's Miami Mix Radio Edit)	3:56
6.	"Es Amor"	4:39
7.	"Amar Es Para Siempre"	3:52
8.	"El Deseo de tu Amor"	3:36
9.	"El Deseo de tu Amor" (Remix)	3:47
10.	"If You Had My Love" (Cyber Jungle Remix)	3:53
11.	"If You Had My Love" (instrumental)	4:26
12.	"If You Had My Love" (a capella)	4:07
13.	"Let's Get Loud" (instrumental)	4:07
14.	"Let's Get Loud" (a capella)	3:53
15.	"No Me Ames" (Pablo Flores Club Remix Radio Edit) (with Marc Anthony)	4:35
16.	"No Me Ames" (instrumental)	4:38
17.	"No Me Ames" (a capella with Marc Anthony)	4:24
Total length:		63:54

=== Notes ===
- ^{^a} contains a sample from "Love and Liberte", written by Baliardo and Reyes, as performed by Gipsy Kings
- ^{^b} signifies a co-producer
- ^{^c} contains a sample from "Set It Off", written by Standard and Logios, as performed by Strafe
- ^{^d} signifies an executive producer and producer
- ^{^e} signifies a Spanish translator
- ^{^f} signifies an executive producer
- ^{^g} signifies a vocal producer
- ^{^h} signifies a music producer
- ^{^i} signifies an additional producer and remixer

== Personnel ==
Credits for On the 6 adapted from AllMusic

Production

- Ariel – engineer
- Charles "Prince Charles" Alexander – mixing
- Marcelo Añez – engineer
- Chuck Bailey – assistant engineer, engineer
- David Barratt – production coordination
- Tom Bender – assistant engineer, engineer, mixing, mixing assistant
- Manny Benito - vocal director
- Juan Bohorquez – assistant engineer
- Gustavo Bonnet – assistant engineer
- Ariel Borujow – assistant engineer
- Darrell Branch – producer
- Bob Cadway – engineer
- Brian Calicchia – assistant engineer, engineer
- Sean "Puffy" Combs – producer
- Lauren Dawson – producer
- Emilio Estefan Jr. – executive producer, producer
- Bobby Fernandez – engineer
- Alfred Figueroa – assistant engineer
- Pablo Flores – mixing, photography
- Javier Garza – engineer, mixing
- David Gleeson – engineer
- Larry Gold – string arrangements, conductor, engineer
- Franklin Grant – engineer
- Mick Guzauski – mixing, remixing
- Brian Harding – assistant engineer, engineer
- Dan Hetzel – engineer, mixing
- Jim Janik – digital editing, vocal tracking
- Rob Jenkins – producer
- Rodney Jerkins – producer
- Richie Jones – arranger, percussion, producer, programming, remixing
- Pete Krawiec – assistant engineer, engineer
- Sebastián Krys – engineer
- Bob Ludwig – mastering
- Bill Makina – programming
- Glen Marchese – assistant engineer, engineer, string engineer
- Tony Mardini – assistant engineer
- Tony Maserati – mixing
- Lester Mendez – programming
- Steve Menezes – assistant engineer, engineer
- Freddy Piñero Jr. – engineer
- Poke & Tone – producer, programming
- Jim Porto – assistant engineer
- Herb Powers – mastering
- Prince Charles – engineer, mixing, background vocals
- Simon Ramone – assistant engineer, engineer
- Bill Molina – programming
- Dave Reitzas – engineer
- David Rideau – engineer
- Kike Santander – arranger, producer
- William Ross – conductor, string arrangements and conductor
- Dave Scheuer – arranger, engineer, programming
- David Shackney – engineer
- Dan Shea – arranger, digital editing, engineer, keyboard programming, keyboards, producer, programming, vocal producer
- Chucky Thompson – programming
- Rick Wake – arranger, producer
- Alvin West –, piano, producer, programming
- Chris Wiggins – assistant engineer
- Robb Williams – assistant engineer, engineer, string engineer
- Mario Winans – programming
- Thomas R. Yezzi – engineer
- Juan Vincente Zambrano – arranger, keyboards, producer, programming

Performance

- 7 Mile Primary – background vocals
- Donna Allen – background vocals
- Maria Christiansen – background vocals
- Kenny Anderson – saxophone
- Marc Anthony – guest artist
- Randy Barlow – trumpet
- Juan Barrett
- Tom Barney – arranger, bass
- Big Punisher – rap
- Edwin Bonilla – percussion
- Angie Chirino – background vocals
- Sal Cuevas – bass
- LaShawn Daniels – background vocals
- Ximera DePombo – background vocals
- Lawrence Dermer – keyboards, producer, background vocals
- Margaret Dorn – background vocals
- Paquito Echevarria – piano
- Fat Joe – rap
- Sandy Griffith – background vocals
- Douglas Guevara – bongos, timbales
- Douglas Guevera – bongos, congas, timbales
- Shawnyette Harrell – background vocals
- Skyler Jett – background vocals
- Jennifer Karr – background vocals
- Eric Kupper – keyboards
- Bill Lawrence – background vocals
- Michael Landau – guitar
- Kyra Lawrence – background vocals
- Jennifer Lopez – vocals, executive producer
- Manny López – guitar
- Manuel Lopez – guitar
- Doug Michels – trumpet
- Chieli Minucci – guitar
- Herman "Teddy" Mulet – trombone
- Conesha Owens – background vocals
- Konesha Owens – background vocals
- Dean Parks – guitar
- Lena Pérez – background vocals
- Wendy Peterson – background vocals
- Archie Pena – percussion
- Rita Quintero – background vocals
- Tracy Reid – background vocals
- Claytoven Richardson – background vocals
- Lance "Un" Rivera – producer
- Corey Rooney – arranger, executive producer, keyboards, background vocals
- Jack Stamates – violin
- Michael Thompson – guitar
- Michael Hart Thompson – guitar
- Rene Toledo – guitar
- Kim Travis – background vocals
- Jorges Valero – background vocals
- José Miguel Velásquez – background vocals
- Al West – piano, producer
- Betty Wright – vocal producer, background vocals
- Peter Zizzo – arranger, keyboards

Miscellaneous

- Chris Apostle – project coordinator
- Kevyn Aucoin – makeup
- Christopher Austopchuk – art direction, design
- Danny Santiago — stylist
- Ignacio Ballesteros – Spanish adaptation
- Tony Duran – photography
- Leena Kallash – assistant
- Oribe – hairstylist
- Julian Peploe – art direction, design
- Stephen Saper – author

== Charts ==
=== Weekly charts ===
Weekly chart performance for On the 6
Chart (1999)	Peak position
Australian Albums (ARIA)	11
Austrian Albums (Ö3 Austria)	7
Belgian Albums (Ultratop Flanders)	10
Belgian Albums (Ultratop Wallonia)	6
Canadian Albums (Billboard)	5
Canadian R&B Albums (Nielsen SoundScan)	1
Dutch Albums (Album Top 100)	6
European Albums (Music & Media)	8
Finnish Albums (Suomen virallinen lista)	15
French Albums (SNEP)	15
German Albums (Offizielle Top 100)	3
Greek Foreign Albums (IFPI Greece)	5
Hungarian Albums (MAHASZ)	14
Icelandic Albums (Tónlist)	19
Irish Albums (IRMA)	67
Italian Albums (FIMI)	13
Japanese Albums (Oricon)	20
New Zealand Albums (RMNZ)	18
Norwegian Albums (VG-lista)	14
Portuguese Albums (AFP)	9
Scottish Albums (Official Charts)	43
Singaporean Albums (SPVA)	9
Spanish Albums (PROMUSICAE)	12
Swedish Albums (Sverigetopplistan)	20
Swiss Albums (Schweizer Hitparade)	3
Taiwanese International Albums (IFPI Taiwan)	10
UK Albums (Official Charts)	14
UK R&B Albums (Official Charts)	4
US Billboard 200	8
US Top R&B/Hip-Hop Albums (Billboard)	8

=== Year-end charts ===
1999 year-end chart performance for On the 6
Chart (1999)	Position
Australian Albums (ARIA)	79
Austrian Albums (Ö3 Austria)	40
Belgian Albums (Ultratop Flanders)	59
Belgian Albums (Ultratop Wallonia)	35
Canadian Albums (RPM)	17
Dutch Albums (Album Top 100)	57
European Albums (Music & Media)	39
French Albums (SNEP)	66
German Albums (Offizielle Top 100)	32
Spanish Albums (AFYVE)	34
Spanish Foreign Albums (AFYVE)	15
Swiss Albums (Schweizer Hitparade)	44
UK Albums (OCC)	80
US Billboard 200	50
US Billboard Top R&B/Hip-Hop Albums	71

2000 year-end chart performance for On the 6
Chart (2000)	Position
Australian Albums (ARIA)	98
Belgian Albums (Ultratop Flanders)	87
Canadian Albums (Nielsen SoundScan)	129
Dutch Albums (Album Top 100)	60
Finnish Foreign Albums	188
German Albums (Offizielle Top 100)	82
US Billboard 200	101

2001 year-end chart performance for On the 6
Chart (2001)	Position
Canadian R&B Albums (Nielsen SoundScan)	101

2002 year-end chart performance for On the 6
Chart (2002)	Position
Canadian R&B Albums (Nielsen SoundScan)	132

2003 year-end chart performance for On the 6
Chart (2003)	Position
Belgian Albums (Ultratop Flanders)	94

== Certifications and sales ==
Certifications and sales for On the 6
Region	Certification	Certified units/sales
Argentina (CAPIF)	Gold	38,000
Australia (ARIA)	Platinum	70,000^{^}
Austria (IFPI Austria)	Gold	25,000^{*}
Belgium (BRMA)	Gold	25,000^{*}
Canada (Music Canada)	5× Platinum	500,000^{^}
Finland	—	10,505
France (SNEP)	2× Gold	200,000^{*}
Germany (BVMI)	Gold	250,000^{^}
Greece (IFPI Greece)	Gold	15,000^{^}
Indonesia	Platinum	50,000
Italy (FIMI)	Platinum	100,000^{*}
Japan (RIAJ)	Gold	200,000
Mexico	—	100,000
Netherlands (NVPI)	Platinum	100,000^{^}
New Zealand (RMNZ)	Gold	7,500^{^}
Norway	—	23,000
Poland (ZPAV)	Platinum	70,000^{*}
Spain (Promusicae)	2× Platinum	300,000
Switzerland (IFPI Switzerland)	Platinum	50,000^{^}
United Kingdom (BPI)	Platinum	300,000^{‡}
United States (RIAA)	3× Platinum	3,000,000^{^}
Summaries
Europe (IFPI)	Platinum	1,000,000^{*}
Latin America sales in 1999	—	300,000
Worldwide	—	10,000,000
^{*} Sales figures based on certification alone.^{^} Shipments figures based on certification alone.^{‡} Sales+streaming figures based on certification alone.

== Release history ==
Release history and formats for On the 6
Country	Date	Format	Label
United States	June 1, 1999	CD; cassette	Work
France	June 18, 1999	CD	MCA DreamWorks
Japan	June 23, 1999	CD	Sony
Germany	July 5, 1999	CD	Sony
Spain	November 24, 1999	CD	Sony
