= Feelin' So Good =

2000 single by Jennifer Lopez

Single by Jennifer Lopez featuring Big Pun and Fat Joe

from the album On the 6
- A-side: "Let's Get Loud"
- Released: January 25, 2000
- Recorded: 1999
- Studio: Daddy's House Recording Studios (New York, NY); Sony Music Studios (New York, NY)
- Genre: Hip hop; R&B
- Length: 5:26 (album version); 2:59 (radio edit)
- Label: Work; Epic
- Songwriters: Sean "Puffy" Combs; Jennifer Lopez; Cory Rooney; Steven Standard; George Logios; Christopher Rios; Joseph Cartagena
- Producer: Sean "Puffy" Combs

Jennifer Lopez singles chronology
"Waiting for Tonight" (1999)	"Feelin' So Good" (2000)	"Let's Get Loud" (2000)

Big Pun singles chronology
"You Came Up" (1998)	"Feelin' So Good" (2000)	"It's So Hard" (2000)

Fat Joe singles chronology
"Bet Ya Man Can't (Triz)" (1998)	"Feelin' So Good" (2000)	"We Thuggin'" (2001)

Music video
- "Feelin' So Good" on YouTube

"Feelin' So Good" is a song by American singer Jennifer Lopez featuring rappers Big Pun and Fat Joe, recorded for her debut studio album, On the 6 (1999). A midtempo R&B and hip hop song, it was written by Lopez, Cory Rooney, Sean "Puffy" Combs, Steven Standard, George Logios, Christopher Rios and Joseph Cartagena, and produced by Combs. The song contains a sample of Strafe's 1984 single "Set It Off". It was released by Work and Epic on January 25, 2000, as the fourth single from On the 6.

"Feelin' So Good" received positive reviews from music critics, with reviewers highlighting Combs's production and the song's more overtly R&B- and hip hop-oriented sound in comparison to Lopez's earlier singles. Commercially, it reached number 51 on the Billboard Hot 100, while peaking within the top 20 in several international markets, including Australia, New Zealand and the United Kingdom. In the United States, it topped the Billboard Dance Club Play chart. The song's promotion coincided with the death of Big Pun in February 2000; its Paul Hunter-directed music video was later described as a tribute to the rapper and an homage to Lopez's Bronx upbringing.

== Background and composition ==
With On the 6, Jennifer Lopez said she wanted to establish a sound that reflected both her influences and her upbringing. In a 1999 interview with the Los Angeles Times, she said she entered the studio wanting to combine pop music with Latin, R&B and urban influences, and noted that the album's title referred to the subway line she rode from the Bronx into Manhattan. Discussing "Feelin' So Good", Lopez said Sean Combs had given her the "set-it-off track" after executive producer Cory Rooney got in touch with him. She described the song as a look back at her life in the Bronx after high school, recalling a time when "you don't have a care in the world", and said she wrote it during a difficult point in the album sessions, when she had to remind herself that making music was what she had "always wanted".

A midtempo R&B and hip hop song, "Feelin' So Good" was written by Lopez, Rooney, Christopher Rios, Joseph Cartagena, Combs, Steven Standard and George Logios, with Combs producing the track. It features guest verses from Big Pun and Fat Joe and contains a sample of Strafe's 1984 single "Set It Off". Lopez recorded the song at Daddy's House Recording Studios and Sony Music Studios in New York City; Jim Janik edited it and Prince Charles Alexander mixed it.

== Release ==
"Feelin' So Good" was serviced by Work and Epic in the United States on January 25, 2000. During March and April 2000, Music & Media recorded playlist additions for the single at radio stations across Europe, including outlets in Spain and Germany, reflecting its broader international rollout.

The single's promotion coincided with the death of featured rapper Big Pun in February 2000. In its obituary of Pun, the Los Angeles Times reported that he appeared on Lopez's "new single" and had been scheduled to perform with Lopez and Fat Joe on Saturday Night Live, but withdrew after feeling unwell. Lopez told MTV News that Pun had been "a source of pride for the Latin community" and said that "we will miss him terribly".

== Critical reception ==
In a review of On the 6, Richard Torres of Newsday wrote that Sean "Puffy" Combs showed "a deft studio touch" on "Feelin' So Good", adding that Lopez performed well on a track he felt was "tailor-made for the talents of Mary J. Blige".

Reviewing the single for Billboard, Chuck Taylor wrote that it "abruptly changes gears" from Lopez's earlier releases, describing it as "less Latin, more R&B-coated". He added that the song was "pumped with enough bass to bend steel" and singled out its "sunny chorus" as one of its commercial strengths.

In a 2019 retrospective on On the 6, Billboard described "Feelin' So Good" as the album's "most heavily hip-hop-indebted song".

== Promotion ==
=== Music video ===
The music video for "Feelin' So Good" was directed by Paul Hunter. In a retrospective ranking of Lopez's videos, Remezcla wrote that the clip "became a tribute to the late Big Pun" and "an homage to J.Lo's life in her Bronx neighborhood before she became famous"; the publication also noted a cameo by Lopez's mother. Vogue similarly described "Feelin' So Good" as "another anthem to the Bronx", highlighting Lopez's black puffer jacket, jeans and Timberland boots, as well as a shopping sequence in the video. Writing in The New Yorker in 2024, Lauren Michele Jackson cited "Feelin' So Good" as one of the strongest examples of Lopez's Bronx-rooted video work, and wrote that her performance in the clip recalled the influence of Janet Jackson.

=== Live performances ===
Lopez promoted "Feelin' So Good" with a performance at the 2000 Nickelodeon Kids' Choice Awards. She also appeared as the musical guest on the February 5, 2000 episode of Saturday Night Live. Writing shortly after Big Pun's death, the Los Angeles Times reported that he had been scheduled to join Lopez and Fat Joe for the Saturday Night Live performance, but withdrew after feeling unwell.

== Formats and track listings ==
- Australian CD maxi single
1. "Feelin' So Good" (Radio Edit) — 2:59
2. "Feelin' So Good" (Album Version) — 5:26
3. "Waiting for Tonight" (Hex's Momentous Radio Mix) — 3:52
- Australian CD maxi single (The Remixes)
1. "Feelin' So Good" (Radio Edit) — 2:59
2. "Feelin' So Good" (HQ2 Radio Mix) — 3:45
3. "Feelin' So Good" (Bad Boy Alternate Mix) — 4:29
4. "Feelin' So Good" (Thunderpuss Radio Mix) — 3:50
5. "Feelin' So Good" (Thunderpuss Club Mix) — 9:14
6. "Feelin' So Good" (HQ2 Club Mix) — 7:25
- European CD single
1. "Feelin' So Good" (Radio Edit) — 2:59
2. "Feelin' So Good" (HQ2 Radio Mix) — 3:45
- European CD maxi single
1. "Feelin' So Good" (Radio Edit) — 2:59
2. "Feelin' So Good" (HQ2 Radio Mix) — 3:45
3. "Feelin' So Good" (Bad Boy Alternate Mix) — 4:29
4. "Feelin' So Good" (Thunderpuss Radio Mix) — 3:50
- European 12" vinyl
1. "Feelin' So Good" (HQ2 Club Mix) — 7:25
2. "Feelin' So Good" (Bad Boy Alternate Mix) — 4:29
3. "Feelin' So Good" (Thunderpuss Club Mix) — 9:14
4. "Feelin' So Good" (Album Version) — 5:26
- UK cassette single
1. "Feelin' So Good" — 5:26
2. "Feelin' So Good" (Puffy's Single Mix) — 4:31
- UK CD single
1. "Feelin' So Good" — 5:26
2. "Feelin' So Good" (Puffy's Single Mix) — 4:31
3. "If You Had My Love" (Dark Child Master Mix) — 4:25
- US CD single / 7" vinyl
1. "Feelin' So Good" (Bad Boy Remix) — 4:31
2. "Feelin' So Good" (Album Version) — 5:30
- US CD maxi single
1. "Feelin' So Good" (Thunderpuss Radio Mix) — 3:50
2. "Feelin' So Good" (HQ2 Radio Mix) — 3:45
3. "Feelin' So Good" (Thunderpuss Club Mix) — 9:16
4. "Feelin' So Good" (HQ2 Club Mix) — 7:25
5. "Waiting for Tonight" (Hex's Momentous Club Mix) — 11:17
- US 12" vinyl
1. "Feelin' So Good" (Thunderpuss Club Mix) — 9:14
2. "Feelin' So Good" (HQ2 Club Mix) — 7:25
3. "Feelin' So Good" (Thunderpuss Tribe-A-Pella) — 6:56
4. "Feelin' So Good" (Bad Boy Alternate Mix) — 4:29
5. "Feelin' So Good" (Album Version) — 5:30

== Charts ==
=== Weekly charts ===
Chart (2000)	Peak position
Australia (ARIA)	20
Belgium (Ultratop 50 Flanders)	42
Belgium (Ultratop 50 Wallonia)	24
Canada (Nielsen SoundScan)	19
Canada (Nielsen SoundScan) Import-only single	7
Canada Dance/Urban (RPM)	12
Canada Top Singles (RPM)	7
Czech Republic (IFPI)	34
European Hot 100 Singles (Music & Media)	29
European Radio Top 50 (Music & Media)	30
Germany (GfK)	39
Iceland (Íslenski Listinn Topp 40)	19
Italy (FIMI)	27
Netherlands (Dutch Top 40)	30
Netherlands (Single Top 100)	32
New Zealand (Recorded Music NZ)	11
Romania (Romanian Top 100)	7
Scottish Singles Sales (Official Charts)	21
Sweden (Sverigetopplistan)	58
Switzerland (Schweizer Hitparade)	22
UK Singles (Official Charts)	15
UK Hip Hop/R&B (Official Charts)	3
US Billboard Hot 100	51
US Dance Club Songs (Billboard)	1
US Dance Singles Sales (Billboard)	2
US Hot R&B/Hip-Hop Songs (Billboard)	44
US Pop Airplay (Billboard)	27
US Rhythmic Airplay (Billboard)	18

=== Year-end charts ===
Chart (2000)	Position
Romania (Romanian Top 100)	72
UK Urban (Music Week)	37
US Hot Dance Club-Play Singles (Billboard)	45
US Hot Dance Maxi-Singles Sales (Billboard)	18
US Rhythmic Top 40 (Billboard)	45

Chart (2001)	Position
Canada (Nielsen SoundScan)	169

== Certifications ==
Region	Certification	Certified units/sales
Australia (ARIA)	Gold	35,000^{^}
^{^} Shipments figures based on certification alone.

== Release history ==
Country	Date	Format	Label
United States	January 25, 2000	Urban radio	550; Epic
Germany	March 20, 2000	CD single	Columbia
United States	May 2, 2000	CD single	Epic

== See also ==
- List of number-one dance singles of 2000 (U.S.)
