= Let's Get Loud =

2000 single by Jennifer Lopez

Single by Jennifer Lopez

from the album On the 6
- B-side: "Feelin' So Good"
- Released: June 13, 2000
- Recorded: 1999
- Studio: Crescent Moon Studios (Miami, FL)
- Genre: Dance-pop; Latin pop; salsa
- Length: 3:58
- Label: Columbia; Work
- Songwriters: Gloria Estefan; Kike Santander
- Producers: Emilio Estefan, Jr.; Kike Santander

Jennifer Lopez singles chronology
"Feelin' So Good" (2000)	"Let's Get Loud" (2000)	"Love Don't Cost a Thing" (2000)

Music video
- "Let's Get Loud" on YouTube

"Let's Get Loud" is a song by American singer Jennifer Lopez from her 1999 debut studio album, On the 6. Originally written by the song's co-writer Gloria Estefan for herself, she felt as if the song was too similar to her previous material and passed it onto Lopez. Estefan, who co-wrote the song alongside Kike Santander, stated that Lopez would have "more fun with it" and would put "a new spin" on it. "Let's Get Loud" is regarded as Lopez's signature song. Estefan eventually released her own version of the song in 2011 as a bonus track on the deluxe Target edition of her album Miss Little Havana.

"Let's Get Loud" charted worldwide, reaching the top ten in five European countries, including number one in Hungary. Although not released in the United States, it charted on the US Billboard Hot Dance Club Songs. The song received positive critical response and at the 43rd Annual Grammy Awards in 2001, Lopez earned her second consecutive nomination for the Grammy Award for Best Dance Recording. An accompanying music video directed by Jeffrey Doe was filmed live at the 1999 FIFA Women's World Cup.

== Background ==
After a series of co-starring film roles, Jennifer Lopez received her big break in 1996, when she was cast to play the title role in Selena, a biopic of the late American singer-songwriter Selena. In the film, Selena's real voice is used for the musical sequences, but Lopez would nonetheless sing the lyrics during the scenes instead of lip syncing. When asked by an interview if Selena inspired her to launch a music career, Lopez stated: "I really, really became inspired, because I started my career in musical theater on stage. So doing the movie just reminded me of how much I missed singing, dancing, and the like..." After filming Selena, Lopez was "really feeling [her] Latin roots" and cut a demo in Spanish. Lopez's manager Benny Medina then sent the song, entitled "Vivir Sin Ti", to Sony Music Entertainment's Work Records, who showed an interest in signing Lopez. Tommy Mottola, the head of the label suggested to her that she sing in English instead. She complied and began recording her debut studio album On the 6. During production of the On the 6, Lopez was aware of the fact that she received her recording contract on the premise of her looks and having an already established name in the entertainment industry, and wanted to prove that she had musical talent. Prior to the debut of her music, critics wondered why she would take the risk of launching a music career. It was noted that: "If the album was a flop, not only would it embarrass Lopez, but it might even damage her career."

== Music and lyrics ==
"Let's Get Loud" was originally written by Gloria Estefan, but she felt as if the song was too similar to her previous recordings. She then passed the song to Lopez, stating that she would have "more fun with it" and would put "a new spin" on it. "Let's Get Loud" was written by Estefan and Kike Santander, who also arranged and co-produced the song alongside Emilio Estefan Jr. Javier Garza and Marcelo Anez recorded Lopez's vocals for the song at Crescent Moon Studios in Miami, Florida. Pablo Flores mixed the song also at Crescent Moon Studios.

== Critical reception and accolades ==
Mario Tarradell from The Dallas Morning News complimented the Latin flavor in the song, writing "Jennifer Lopez wastes no time asserting her Latina heritage: "Let's Get Loud," a cut from the actress—turned—singer's debut album, On the 6, opens with a sassy declaration – '¡Ya Jenny llego, presente!'" Heather Phares from AllMusic, on her review of On the 6 gave a positive review of the song, stating that "'Let's Get Loud' have a fiery, soulful sound more in keeping with Lopez's public persona." Michael Paoletta from Billboard, commented that the song's remixes "deliver the goods in a variety of ways", further explaining that the Kung Pow remix "ups the ante" with the Castle Hills Club mix, considering that it "overflows with diva attitude and Latin/pop sensibilities." Richard Torres from Newsday gave a negative review of the song, stating that it was a "total misfire" and that "Lopez simply doesn't supply enough oomph to drive this salsa-injected tune. She's far too feathery where she should truly get down." At the 43rd Grammy Awards in 2001, Lopez earned her second consecutive nomination for the Grammy Award for Best Dance Recording (having been nominated for "Waiting for Tonight" in 2000).

== Chart performance ==
"Let's Get Loud" debuted on the Australian Singles chart at number 49 the week ending August 20, 2000. On the week ending November 12, 2000, the song reached its peak at number nine and stayed there for five consecutive weeks. In Austria, the song debuted at number 35 on the week ending July 9, 2000, and reached its peak of eleven August 20, 2000. "Let's Get Loud" fared better on Italy and Netherlands. On the former, it debuted at number twelve the week ending June 22, 2000, and reached its peak at number six the following week, managing to stay inside the top ten for five consecutive weeks before dropping of the chart. On the latter, it reached number three, becoming the highest peak of the song in all music markets.

Not released as a single in the US, the song still appeared at number 39 on the US Billboard Hot Dance Club Play chart. "Let's Get Loud" later appeared at number 25 on the Australian year-end charts of 2000. It has sold 413,000 digital downloads in the United States as of 2013.

== Live performances ==
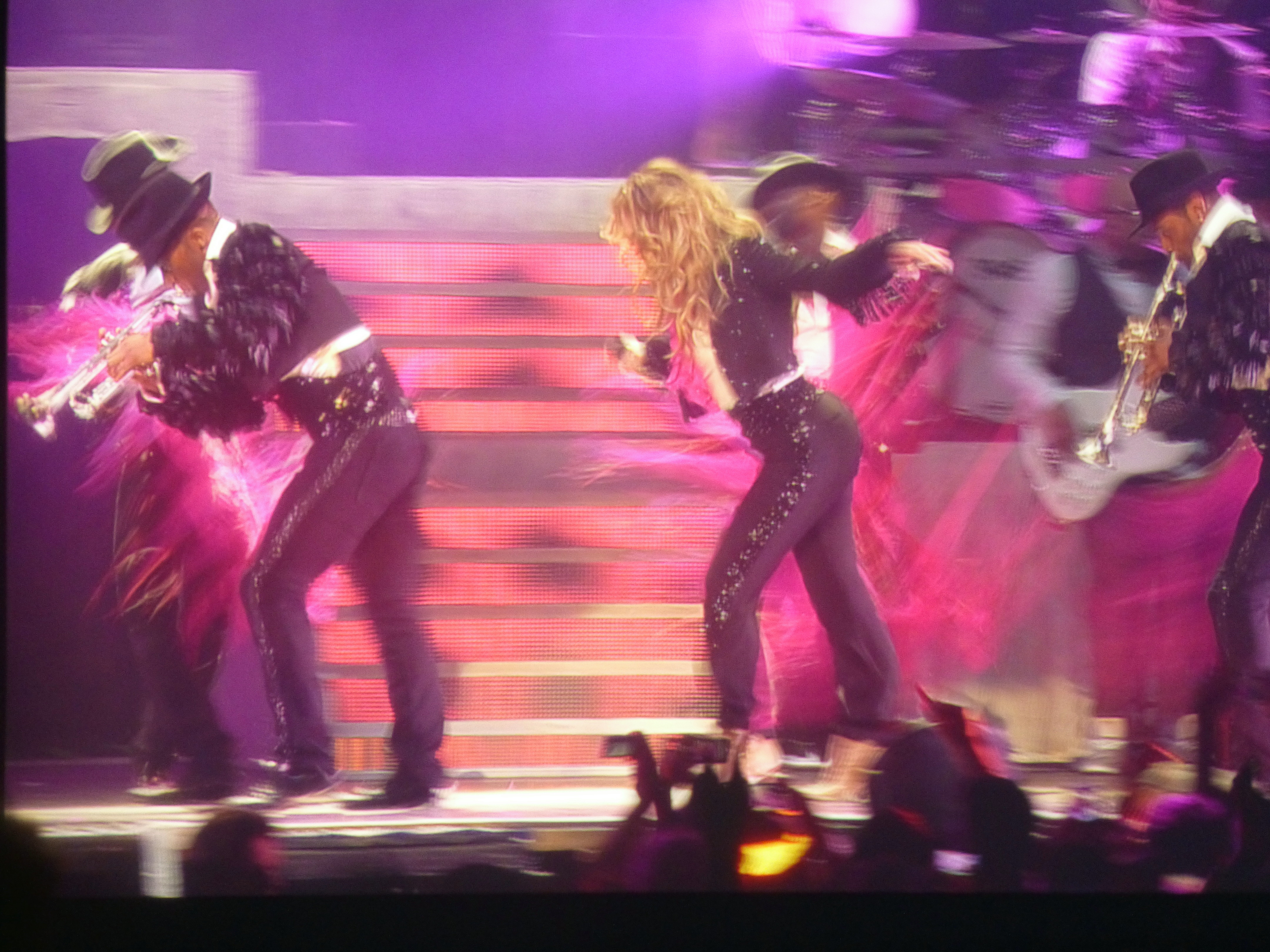
Lopez performing "Let's Get Loud" in Paris on her Dance Again World Tour, 2012

The song's music video was directed by Jeffrey Doe and filmed live at the 1999 FIFA Women's World Cup at the Rose Bowl in Pasadena, California. Lopez wears a silver party dress with white boots in the video. On October 23, 2007, while pregnant, Lopez performed the song on the 5th season of the United States version of Dancing with the Stars. She performed the song at the Sanremo Music Festival in 2010. Autistic young students at a Staten Island, New York, school listened to "Let's Get Loud" every day, learning the dance moves and lyrics. The school wrote a letter to Lopez asking for an autograph or picture—instead Lopez showed up for the student's graduation for live performance of the song.

Lopez performed "Let's Get Loud" as part of her 2012 Dance Again World Tour. She emerged on-stage wearing a tuxedo with pink ruffles while playing a bongo, before transitioning into "Let's Get Loud". During the performance, her dancers ripped off the tuxedo to reveal a black-laced body suit. The song was included on the set list for her Las Vegas residency, All I Have, which commenced in January 2016. Lopez performed "Let's Get Loud" on the season 15 finale of American Idol on April 7, 2016, alongside her single "Ain't Your Mama".

On February 2, 2020, the song was performed by Lopez with her child, Emme Muñiz, as well as Shakira, during the Super Bowl LIV halftime show.

== Formats and track listings ==
French CD single
No.	Title	Length
1.	"Let's Get Loud" (featuring Big Pun & Fat Joe)	3:58
2.	"Feelin' So Good"	3:39

Australian maxi single
No.	Title	Length
1.	"Let's Get Loud" (Album version)	3:59
2.	"Let's Get Loud" (Kung Pow Radio Mix)	3:57
3.	"Let's Get Loud" (Castle Hill Club Mix)	8:08
4.	"Let's Get Loud" (D.MD Strong Club)	10:32
5.	"Let's Get Loud" (Matt & Vito's Live Your Club Mix)	11:19

European maxi single
No.	Title	Length
1.	"Let's Get Loud" (Album version)	3:58
2.	"Let's Get Loud" (Kung Pow Radio Mix)	3:57
3.	"Let's Get Loud" (Castle Hill Club Mix)	8:08
4.	"Let's Get Loud (1999 Women's World Cup Performance)" (Matt & Vito's Live Your Life Radio Edit)	4:11

12-inch vinyl
No.	Title	Length
1.	"Let's Get Loud" (D. MD Strong Club)	10:32
2.	"Let's Get Loud" (Matt & Vito's Live Your Life Club Mix)	11:19
3.	"Let's Get Loud" (Castle Hill Club Mix)	8:08
4.	"Let's Get Loud" (Kung Pow Radio Mix)	3:57

== Credits and personnel ==
Credits adapted from the liner notes of On the 6.

Recording

- Recorded and mixed at Crescent Moon Studios in Miami, Florida.

Personnel

- Executive producer(s) – Emilio Estefan Jr.
- Producer(s) – Emilio Estefan Jr., Kike Santander
- Arrangements – Kike Santander
- Background vocals – Donna Allen, Betty Wright
- Piano – Paquito Hechavarría
- Programming – Lester Mendez
- Percussion – Edwin Bonilla
- Trumpets – Randall Barlow, Douglas Michels
- Trombone – Hernán "Teddy" Mulet
- Saxophone – Kenny Anderson
- Recording engineer(s) – Javier Garza, Marcelo Anez
- Mixing engineer(s) – Pablo Flores

== Charts ==
=== Weekly charts ===
Chart (2000)	Peak position
Australia (ARIA)	9
Australian Dance (ARIA)	4
Austria (Ö3 Austria Top 40)	11
Belgium (Ultratop 50 Flanders)	7
Belgium (Ultratop 50 Wallonia)	21
Canada (Nielsen SoundScan)	26
Croatia International Airplay (Top lista)	5
Czech Republic (IFPI)	23
Europe Hot 100 Singles (Music & Media)	17
European Radio Top 50 (Music & Media)	9
France (SNEP)	40
Germany (GfK)	13
Greece (IFPI Greece)	13
Hungary (MAHASZ)	1
Iceland (Íslenski Listinn Topp 40)	3
Italy (FIMI)	6
Netherlands (Dutch Top 40)	2
Netherlands (Single Top 100)	3
Poland (Polish Airplay Charts)	5
Portugal (AFP)	9
Romania (Romanian Top 100)	9
Sweden (Sverigetopplistan)	52
Switzerland (Schweizer Hitparade)	10
Uruguay (Notimex)	2
US Dance Club Songs (Billboard)	39

Chart (2020)	Peak position
Canadian Digital Song Sales (Billboard)	47
US Digital Song Sales (Billboard)	39

Chart (2026)	Peak position
Israel International Airplay (Media Forest)	10

=== Year-end charts ===
Chart (2000)	Position
Australia (ARIA)	25
Belgium (Ultratop 50 Flanders)	37
Belgium (Ultratop 50 Wallonia)	77
European Hot 100 Singles (Music & Media)	87
European Radio Top 100 (Music & Media)	25
Germany (Media Control)	64
Iceland (Íslenski Listinn Topp 40)	30
Netherlands (Dutch Top 40)	12
Netherlands (Single Top 100)	14
Romania (Romanian Top 100)	88
Switzerland (Schweizer Hitparade)	42

=== Decade-end charts ===
Chart (2000–09)	Position
Netherlands (Single Top 100)	81

== Certifications ==
Region	Certification	Certified units/sales
Australia (ARIA)	3× Platinum	210,000^{‡}
Belgium (BRMA)	Gold	25,000^{*}
Denmark (IFPI Danmark)	Gold	45,000^{‡}
Germany (BVMI)	Gold	250,000^{‡}
Italy (FIMI)	Gold	35,000^{‡}
Mexico (AMPROFON)	Gold	30,000^{‡}
Netherlands (NVPI)	Gold	40,000^{^}
New Zealand (RMNZ)	Platinum	30,000^{‡}
Spain (Promusicae)	Gold	30,000^{‡}
United Kingdom (BPI)	Gold	400,000^{‡}
United States (RIAA)	Platinum	1,000,000^{‡}
^{*} Sales figures based on certification alone.^{^} Shipments figures based on certification alone.^{‡} Sales+streaming figures based on certification alone.

== Release history ==
Country	Date	Format	Label
Germany	June 13, 2000	CD single	Sony
