= If You Had My Love =

1999 single by Jennifer Lopez

Single by Jennifer Lopez

from the album On the 6
- B-side: "No Me Ames"
- Released: May 4, 1999
- Recorded: 1998
- Studio: Sony Music (New York City)
- Genre: Pop; R&B
- Length: 4:26
- Label: Work
- Songwriters: Rodney Jerkins; LaShawn Daniels; Cory Rooney; Jennifer Lopez; Fred Jerkins III
- Producer: Rodney Jerkins

Jennifer Lopez singles chronology
"If You Had My Love" (1999)	"No Me Ames" (1999)

Music videos
- "If You Had My Love" on YouTube; "If You Had My Love" (Darkchild remix) on YouTube

"If You Had My Love" is the debut single by American actress and singer Jennifer Lopez from her first studio album, On the 6 (1999). The song was written by Lopez, LaShawn Daniels, Cory Rooney, Fred Jerkins III, and its producer Rodney Jerkins. A midtempo pop and R&B song, it features Latin music and hip hop influences, with lyrics revolving around the beginning of a new relationship, during which Lopez confronts her admirer with a number of ground rules.

Critics reacted positively to "If You Had My Love", praising its groove and production and how it complemented Lopez's voice. Upon its release, the song generated instant attention and became a commercial success, peaking at number one on the US Billboard Hot 100 for five weeks. It became one of the best-selling singles of 1999, selling over 1.2 million units in the US alone. The song was also an international success, topping the charts in Australia, Canada, Finland, Greece, Hungary, and New Zealand, then reached the top five in Denmark, Czech Republic, Germany, Switzerland, France and Belgium (Wallonia), becoming her first ever top five in all of those countries. Its success came as a surprise to critics, making Lopez one of few actors to successfully crossover into the music industry. This also contributed to the growing popularity of Latin artists in the US. In retrospect, the song has been described by a few critics as an "R&B classic", and it is considered one of Lopez's best songs.

The accompanying music video, directed by Paul Hunter, features a voyeuristic internet concept, wherein Lopez's spectators are able to direct her through cyberspace. The provocative video received heavy rotation on MTV networks internationally, allowing Lopez to establish herself in a field that was primarily dominated by Janet Jackson and Madonna. The clip was nominated for four MTV Video Music Awards and five Billboard Music Awards. Lopez promoted "If You Had My Love" through performances at the Blockbuster Entertainment Awards and VH1/Vogue Fashion Awards in 1999. She has subsequently performed it on a number of occasions, including her Let's Get Loud concerts in 2001, and her Dance Again World Tour in 2012, where she performed an acoustic version of the song. It also served as the opening number to her Las Vegas residency show, Jennifer Lopez: All I Have (2016).

== Background ==
After a series of co-starring film roles, Jennifer Lopez had her breakthrough when she was cast in the title role of Selena (1997), a biographical film about American singer-songwriter Selena Quintanilla-Pérez. Working on the film inspired her to launch a music career, with Lopez saying: "I started my career in musical theater on stage. So doing the movie just reminded me of how much I missed singing, dancing, and the like..." After filming Selena, Lopez was "really feeling [her] Latin roots" and recorded a demo record in Spanish. Her manager Benny Medina sent the song ("Vivir Sin Ti") to Sony Music's Work Group, which was interested in signing Lopez. Tommy Mottola, the head of the label, suggested that she sing in English and she began recording her debut album, On the 6. Her decision to launch a musical career was seen as a risk, as film stars had a "patchy record" when it came to releasing pop music, and it was that thought, "If the album was a flop, not only would it embarrass Lopez but it might even damage her career." Lopez originally believed that "Feelin' So Good" featuring Big Pun and Fat Joe was to be released as the album's lead single. "If You Had My Love" was produced by Rodney Jerkins; Lopez recorded her vocals for the song at Sony Music Studios in New York City with engineers Franklyn Grant and Robb Williams. The song was later mixed by Tony Maserati at The Hit Factory in NYC, and subsequently mastered by Herb Powers at Powers House of Sound. Shawnyette Harrell and Jennifer Karr served as backing vocalists.

According to Cory Rooney, one of the song's co-writers, Lopez had almost finished recording On the 6 when Rooney and Jerkins played a CD playlist of songs for Michael Jackson, which included "If You Had My Love". Rooney believed the song was "perfect for Jennifer", and hoped that Jackson would not take it. Rooney recalled: "The music begins and Michael starts moving and shaking to it and he goes, 'Man, I like this one.' My heart sunk. Then he says, 'I don't like it for me, but I like it. It's gonna be a hit for someone else.'" Rooney said that he and LaShawn Daniels wrote "If You Had My Love" later that day. Conversely, journalist Damien Shields stated in 2015 that Rooney had Lopez record the song in 1998, and it had already been allocated to her when Jackson heard it. Jackson thought the song had a "really great groove" and briefly considered recording it. Shields said: "Everyone's like, 'Shit, now we're going to have to argue with the King of Pop because that's already going to be Jennifer's first song and it's already in motion and is going to radio in two months.' How do you possibly tell Michael Jackson no?" Jackson passed on the song, believing it was better suited for a female singer.

"If You Had My Love" became the subject of some controversy when it emerged that Jerkins had written a "nearly identical song" for singer Chanté Moore. Moore asserted that her song "If I Gave Love" was re-written with the same arrangement for Lopez after it was requested by Sean Combs, one of On the 6's producers. Moore said: "He wrote the same song for her. I heard that it was because Puff Daddy walked in and heard my song and said 'I want that song,' and he [Rodney] was like 'Well that's already taken. We wrote that for Chanté,' and he was like 'I want that song.' So Rodney wrote, really, the same song." "If I Gave Love" was intended to be released as a single from her album This Moment Is Mine (1999), but was ultimately scrapped before Lopez recorded her version.

== Composition and lyrics ==
Musically, "If You Had My Love" is a mid-tempo pop and R&B song with a length of four minutes and twenty-five seconds (4:25), which contains elements of salsa and hip hop. The song was written and composed mainly by Rodney Jerkins, LaShawn Daniels and Cory Rooney, with Lopez also penning lyrics; Jerkins also served as producer. It is written in the key of B minor with a tempo of 94 beats per minute. The instrumentation of "If You Had My Love" consists of a piano and guitar. Lopez's vocals in the song span from the lower note of A♯_{3} to the higher note of E♯_{5}. BBC Music writer Michael Cragg remarked that her vocals possessed a "cooing innocence". Beth Johnson of Entertainment Weekly described the song as "slow-funk".

"If You Had My Love"
A twenty second sample of "If You Had My Love", featuring "lust-leery" lyrics, through which Lopez "questions the nature of her beau's affections".

Lyrically, the song has Lopez confronting her admirer in an "insistent" manner with a number of ground rules before they can begin a relationship. MTV's James Dinh said Lopez "lets her insecurities get the best of her" on the track. Billboard writer Leslie Richin wrote that it "served as a cautionary tale for admirers who might one day have a chance with the budding starlet. Bottom line: liars and cheaters need not apply." In the song's opening lines, Lopez states: "Now if I gave you me, this is how it's got to be / First of all I won't take you cheatin' on me / Tell me who can I trust if I can't trust in you / And I refuse to let you play me for a fool." In the chorus, she poses the question: "If you had my love / And I gave you all my trust... / Would you lie to me / And call me baby?" Lopez explained in her book True Love (2014) that the lyrics refer to "the beginning of a new relationship and what I expect and what I want", saying that "there's a little bit of fear in there too, and a feeling of, what will you do if I give you my heart?" The verses consist of her "trying to lay down the rules", while the chorus expresses "all of the fear" that she feels. Jocelyn Vena of MTV News noted that "If You Had My Love" marked the beginning of Lopez exploring the topic of love, which she has continued throughout her career.

== Critical reception ==
"If You Had My Love" was received positively by music critics. In a review of On the 6, NME noted that Lopez "really comes into her own" on the song, describing it as one of the album's "street-smart swingbeat winners". Chuck Taylor of Billboard spoke favorably of the song's production, calling it "contemporary and edgy, straight down the Faith Evans pathway", but noted that its melody was similar to that of Brandy and Monica's "The Boy Is Mine", another song written and composed by Jerkins. Taylor wrote, "Lopez seems to have command of the most important element—her voice—though admittedly, the vocal melody of this song holds tightly to a very narrow edge. Lopez might remind listeners of the funkier side of Vanessa Williams [...] Curiosity alone will propel this onto the pop and R&B airwaves; at that point, the hook, along with an undoubtedly compelling video clip, should take this debut far." AllMusic's Heather Phares said that it has a "fiery, soulful sound more in keeping with Lopez's public persona". Aaron Beierle of DVD Talk praised the song as "catchy", writing that it "showcases the singer's style well".

Johnson of Entertainment Weekly was also favorable, noting the song to feature a "silky groove". Johnson also observed: "Considering the dustbins filled with movie stars' vanity discs, why expect this actress' recording debut to be hit-bound? Well, surprise, surprise." Elysa Gardner of the Los Angeles Times described the track as an "exotic hip hop" workout. Vibe magazine writer Dream Hampton called the song "sweet" and "upbeat", and commented on Lopez's "strong" vocals. Brian McCollum of the Rome News-Tribune called "If You Had My Love" one of the year's most "infectious" singles. In a review of Lopez's remix album J to tha L–O! The Remixes (2002), Sal Cinquemani of Slant Magazine praised the Dark Child remix of "If You Had My Love", which utilized a "delectable" interpolation of Jackson's "Liberian Girl" (1987).

However, Jerome Joseph, also from the Los Angeles Times, was not as positively receptive of the single, arguing that it sounded like a "Brandy or Monica reject", and called Lopez "Paula Abdul 2000". Similarly, Hartford Courant writer Roger Catlin stated that the song is "more of a bland R&B number that could have been sung by anybody", suggesting it has "little Latin flair". While Scott Iwasald of the Deseret News characterized Lopez's vocals as "sultry" but thin, he noted that she finds a "nice ring" in songs such as "If You Had My Love". A retrospective review by Tom Breihan of Stereogum bemoaned that in spite of production showcasing "state-of-the-art late-’90s R&B flutter-gleam" and Lopez's convincing delivery, the song was "overly repetitive and a little too slow", particularly for trading a bridge for two more utterances of the chorus. At the 1999 Teen Choice Awards, the song won the Teen Choice Award for Choice Music – Summer Song.

== Commercial performance ==
Following its release on May 11, 1999, the song garnered instant radio attention. Promotional images relating to the single featured Lopez in "seductive poses" and "skin tight clothing". Billboard commented that the Work Group was "taking every advantage of her sexy image to aid the marketing side". "If You Had My Love" debuted at number 81 on the US Billboard Hot 100 for the week ending May 15, 1999, and moved to number 64 in its second week. The following week, the song sold 66,000 copies, debuting at number five on the Hot 100 Singles Sales chart. This, along with a 16.7% increase in radio audience, allowed it to rise to number eight on the Hot 100; it also reached the top 10 of the Hot R&B/Hip-Hop Songs chart this week. In its fourth week, the song rose to number one on the Hot 100 Singles Sales, with 120,000 units sold during the week, representing an 80% increase in sales. It subsequently moved to number two on the Hot 100, earning the "Greatest Gainer" title of the week.

For the week of June 12, 1999, "If You Had My Love" reached number one on the Hot 100. It experienced 30% increase in sales and an airplay increase of 5.6 million in audience impressions. The song displaced Ricky Martin's "Livin' la Vida Loca" on the Hot 100, which was the first time a Latin artist followed another Latin artist to the top of the chart since Gloria Estefan's "Coming Out of the Dark" replaced Timmy T's "One More Try" in March 1991. Lopez became the first artist to top the Billboard Hot 100 with their debut single since Britney Spears did so with her single "...Baby One More Time" just four months prior. Furthermore, "If You Had My Love" gave the Work Group its first number one hit on the chart. In its sixth week, the song sold a further 170,500 copies. This week, "If You Had My Love" became the second song in the magazine's history to be number one on the Hot 100 and be the "Greatest Gainer" in both sales and airplay, after "Livin' la Vida Loca" in May. In addition, the song also became the first in Billboard history to claim to number one position on the Hot 100, Hot 100 Singles Sales, and R&B Singles Sales charts simultaneously.

For the week ending July 17, 1999, the song fell to number two on the Hot 100, having been dethroned by Destiny's Child's "Bills, Bills, Bills". Despite this, it reached its highest radio audience to date this week, with 84.2 million listeners. It spent five weeks at number one on the Hot 100, tying with Christina Aguilera's "Genie in a Bottle" for the longest-running number one hit of the summer. "If You Had My Love" remained in the top ten until September 1999. The song would also peak at number two on the US Pop Songs chart, six on Hot R&B/Hip-Hop Songs, and five on Hot Dance Club Play. It was the sixth best-selling song in the US of 1999 with 1.2 million copies sold, and was certified platinum by RIAA. In 2015, Billboard ranked the song as the second biggest hit of the summer of 1999, behind "Genie in a Bottle".

The song debuted and peaked at number four on the UK Singles Chart, selling 77,000 copies in its first week. The song became the first of Lopez's 17 top 10 hits in that country. By 2016, it had sold 372,000 copies in the United Kingdom. "If You Had My Love" reached number one in Australia, and was certified platinum by the Australian Recording Industry Association for shipments of 70,000 units. It also topped the charts in New Zealand, Canada, the Netherlands and Finland. In France, it was certified gold by the Syndicat National de l'Édition Phonographique for shipments of 100,000 units and peaked at number four in its twelfth week, becoming Lopez very first top five and the highest-charting song in the country until "I'm Real"(2001). It was also certified gold in Germany, Switzerland, and New Zealand. Reflecting on the song's success in 2011, Lopez said, "Still I think about that and still it's like wow, my first record I ever did went to number one. It's just an overwhelming feeling. This does not happen all the time. This is a very special thing." As of 2017, the single has sold over 5 million copies worldwide.

== Music video ==
=== Production ===
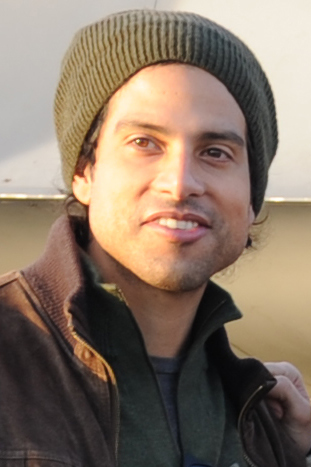
Actor Adam Rodriguez appears in the music video.

The music video for "If You Had My Love" was directed by Paul Hunter. It features a voyeuristic internet theme, wherein a range of viewers watch Lopez through webcams by accessing "Jennifer Lopez Online". The Los Angeles Times described it as a "timely thematic fusion of elaborate dance numbers, the voyeurism of the Internet and Lopez's raw powers of attraction on men, women and little girls". The "interactive" music video was launched in junction with Lopez's own official website at the time. Its "voyeuristic quality" was Hunter's idea, while Combs came up with the website concept that "tied it all together". Lopez, who had a specific idea of how she wanted the dance break to be, described the music video as a collaboration between herself, Hunter, Combs, and her manager Benny Medina. The clip debuted on the May 17, 1999, edition of Total Request Live, and was serviced to music video outlets for the week ending May 22, 1999. Actor Adam Rodriguez, who appears in the music video, said: "Jennifer and I were friends when she called me up to do her video [...] I remember thinking, 'Why not just do it?' Then it turned out that the single was a massive hit and what really catapulted her career to global fame. To be a part of that made it a fun summer because everybody knew that video." Lopez's outfits and accessories in the music video included a white bikini top and low rise sweatpants, a "plunging" gold necklace, and a mini mirror dress during one of the dance sequences. In it, she also sported a sleek hairstyle with honey highlights.

=== Synopsis ===
The music video centers around a "Welcome to Jennifer Lopez Online" concept.

The clip begins in a dark room, where a man (Rodriguez) searches "Jennifer Lopez" on his computer and is redirected to her website (which is displayed by special effects emulating binary numbers). He views a live feed of Lopez in her home, which is filled with cameras. She appears in a number of settings, including a living room and crawling over a table, and is visibly aware of the viewers, waving to the camera before the song begins. The man is not alone in his voyeuristic actions, as patrons of an internet café, a little girl in her bedroom, and Latin women in their kitchen among others are also streaming a live feed of Lopez through computers and internet television. Viewers are able to select where Lopez is located in cyberspace from a range of options. The man clicks on a room showing Lopez in the bathroom, singing whilst checking her reflection in the mirror.

Lopez's feed is also being streamed live to a nightclub and a call center. The man then clicks on the dance option and is once again entered through the special effect binary. Lopez proceeds to perform a series of dances (including jazz, house, and Latin soul) as the song moves into a remixed portion, set to an excerpt of the Pablo Flores remix version. The man then zooms in on Lopez's skirt, as she dances to Latin music. He then raises the sexual intonation again by requesting a scene in which Lopez is taking a shower. A pair of mechanics who had been watching this soon turn their heads to Lopez and pay no attention to their burning car as they glue their eyes to the screen. A new user is introduced, and it is implied that he throws his computer underwater to "turn down the heat" (so to speak), where he continues to watch her. In the original ending, Rodriguez is shown running his left hand underneath his shirt and "sucking his right hand's fingers" while Lopez looks at him through the camera while in the shower. This footage was cut from the final version.

=== Reception and impact ===
Following its release, the "body-emphasizing" music video was played in heavy rotation on MTV. Richin Leslie of Billboard called it "muy caliente" and a "fantasy", and Vibe named it one of her best dance videos. In 2015, BET's Britt Middleton wrote, "We don't think anyone can forget Jennifer's saucy dance number from her debut video." According to monitoring by Nielsen Broadcast Data Systems, the clip became the most played on VH1 at one point in August 1999. In August 1999, a writer from Billboard discussed the video's international impact, writing that Lopez "isn't too far behind Ricky Martin as the leading light of Latin music in Asia. On the strength of the video for 'If You Had My Love,' Lopez has skyrocketed from an unknown to superstar status in markets as diverse as the Philippines and India." Jeff Selamutu, a programming manner from Channel V, opined that Lopez "really pushed the envelope for international female artists" in the Asia-Pacific region, noting: "Up to now, it's only been Janet Jackson and Madonna." As a result, Channel V structured a month-long campaign around the release of On the 6, with "If You Had My Love" being played up to six times a day on the network's international feeds.

Nine.com.au called the music video's cyberstalking vibe "creepy", with Complex magazine regarding the video as one of the "Greatest Tech Moments in Music Video History". Breihan described the video as "a great little time-capsule image of the circa-Y2K internet", and praised the dance interlude, considering the segment "lively enough that I would always feel a serious energy dropoff when the main track came back". Lisa Nakamura analyzed the video in her book Digitizing Race: Visual Cultures of the Internet (2008), noting that it "puts a new spin on the traditional female position as object of the gaze", where Lopez presents herself "as an objective of interactivity". Nakamura added: "In this video we have access to the star's body through the viewer's mind. We see her as he sees her, through interface use. This split represents a paradigmatic dichotomy in gender theory: the body is that of the Latina, the woman of color, and the mind is that of a white man." In Rewind, Play, Fast Forward: The Past, Present and Future of the Music Video (2015), authors Henry Keazor and Thorsten Wübbena observed that "the idea of an online presence of a musical star was conceived and visualized" in the video, writing: "the singer was presented as a sort of 'belle captive' (as one could put it by quoting the title of a novel by Alain Robbe-Grillet), because she seems to be confined to a series of white, clinical rooms where everything is under observation". The authors also noted that the video foreshadowed "the reality as it was viewable" through the YouTube phenomenon. Justin Myers of the Official Charts Company said that the "reality TV-inspired video" which predated the UK version of Big Brother in fact resembled the first series, calling this "J-Lo's #impact". In 2021, American rapper Princess Nokia paid homage to the video in her own music video for "It's Not My Fault", in which she recreated Lopez's look and a number of scenes from "If You Had My Love".

Fuse.tv included "If You Had My Love" among Lopez's most iconic music video looks. Monica Castillo of Cosmopolitan called Lopez's outfit "inexplicably sexy", while Latina magazine writer Nichole Fratangelo said she "looked angelic in white but of course, she gave it a naughty twist". Gaby Wilson of MTV News highlighted the video's influence in Selena Gomez's video for "Slow Down", stating that it was similar to Lopez "dancing solo in that clinically white/silver space". Rolling Stone writer Suzy Exposito considered the video "not just weirdly sexy, but weirdly prescient of the days to follow 9/11, when NSA's omnipresence through technological surveillance became standard for U.S. civilians". At the 1999 MTV Video Music Awards, the video received four nominations, including Best Female Video, Best Dance Video, Best Pop Video, and Best New Artist in a Video. At the 1999 Billboard Music Video Awards, "If You Had My Love" was nominated for the Maximum Vision Award, Best Dance Clip, Best New Artist Dance Clip, Best Pop Clip, and Best New Artist Pop Clip. Lopez was the artist with the most nominations that year.

== Live performances ==
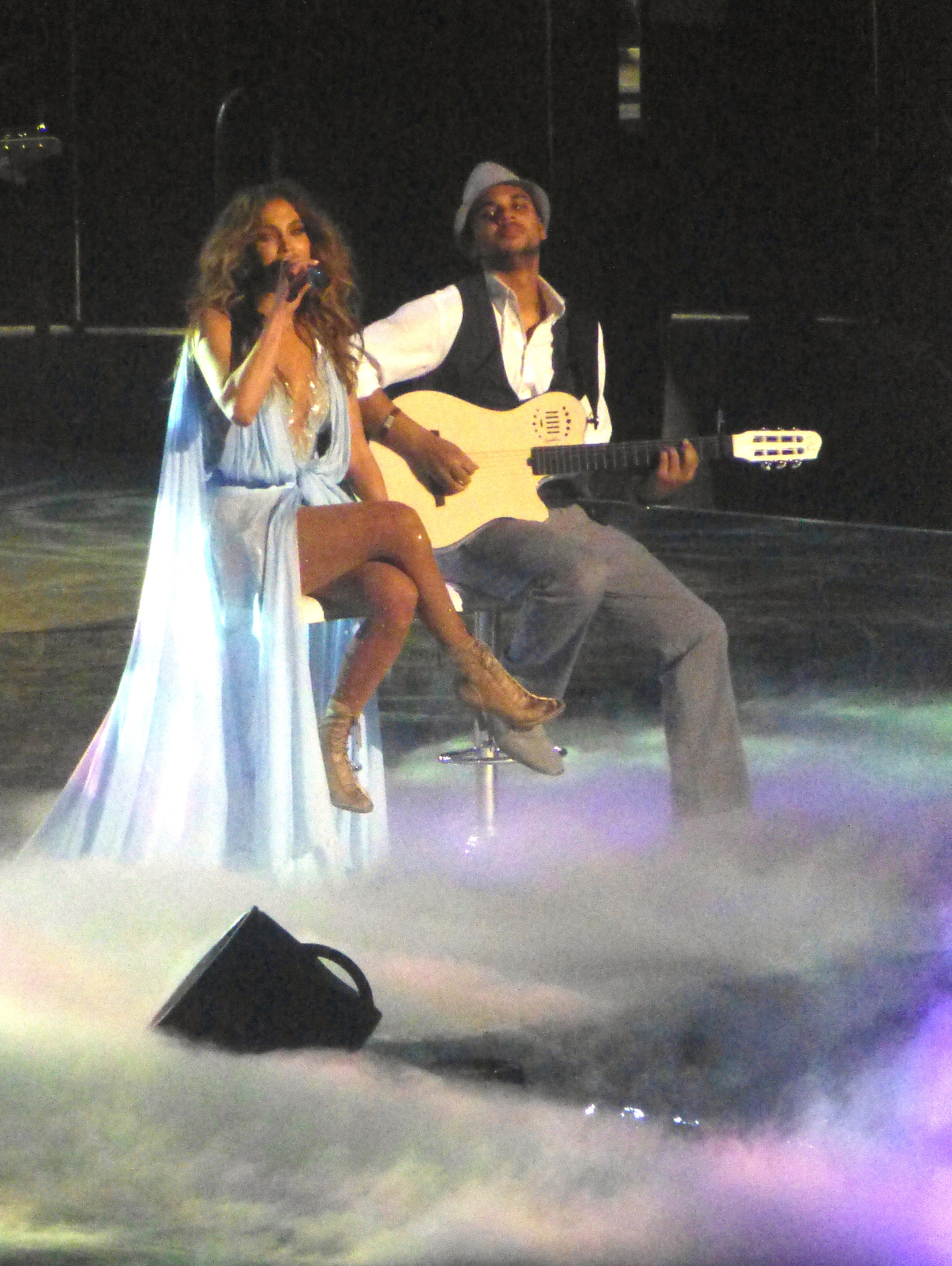
Lopez performing an acoustic version of "If You Had My Love" during her Dance Again World Tour in 2012

Lopez performed "If You Had My Love" at the 5th Blockbuster Entertainment Awards which were held on June 16, 1999. That December, she performed the Darkchild remix of the song at the VH1/Vogue Fashion Awards, where she also won the award for Fashionable Female Artist. In September 2001, performed it again during her Let's Get Loud concerts in Puerto Rico, which were her first full shows.

Lopez included "If You Had My Love" on the set list of her 2007 co-headlining concert tour with then-husband Marc Anthony, which was her first tour. At her October 2011 Mohegan Sun concert celebrating the casino's 15th anniversary, Lopez performed an acoustic version of "If You Had My Love". The stage was lit by blue and surrounded by dry-ice smoke, with Lopez asking the audience, "You want to talk about love?" as she introduced the song. It was reported that Lopez "broke down" in tears after the performance. Lopez once again performed a "stripped down" acoustic version of the song throughout her 2012 Dance Again World Tour. Describing it as the "first real intimate moment of the show", she wanted to perform a "pared down" version of the song so that it would feel like a conversation, "like I'm talking with the audience, sharing where I began and where I find myself now". Gerrick Kennedy of the Los Angeles Times wrote that while "Live ballads still aren't firmly in her wheelhouse", Lopez "sounded best" during the acoustic performance. Michele Amabile Angermiller of The Hollywood Reporter called the performance "a sweet and intimate moment", adding: "Sometimes, simply delivering a song without all the bells and whistles is enough."

At the Dubai World Cup in March 2014, Lopez performed a striptease, in which she had "If You Had My Love" woven in with her song "Girls" (2014). She described the performance as burlesque-esque. "If You Had My Love" serves at the opening number in her Las Vegas residency, Jennifer Lopez: All I Have, which commenced in 2016. The performance was preceded by an "ethereal, fairy-tale overture", where female dancers in showgirl costumes were suspended above the stage. Lopez wore a crystal-encrusted sparkly bodysuit and a white feathered robe. The Guardian writer Eve Barlow called it a "dazzling opening". The song was also incorporated into the striptease segment later in the show, where she "writhed around a chaise lounge".

== Impact ==
Following the release of "If You Had My Love", which according to Taylor was preceded by a "hype storm that has clapped like thunder for months", Lopez rose to international visibility and was propelled to pop stardom. The New York Daily News noted that "the world knew that J.Lo was something special". Radar Online stated that she "became a pop sensation overnight". While she had already achieved notability as an actress, the song's success is what made Lopez a household name. The release of "If You Had My Love" and On the 6 allowed Lopez to join an "elite circle" of actors who had successfully crossed over to music, becoming the first since Vanessa Williams in 1992 and Martika in 1989. In 2008, News.com.au wrote that the transition from actress to singer "has always been a precarious career path, claiming many victims", identifying Lopez as one of the "success stories that keep a steady stream of actresses attempting to make that career crossover". The website also wrote: "For every success story there are more than a handful of failures, or in celebrity-to-celebrity ratio, one Jennifer Lopez to three Minnie Drivers." Rolling Stone noted that the single marked the beginning of Lopez's own media empire. Writing for Dazed, Kat George opined that Lopez was a celebrity feminist, a premise that was defined by "If You Had My Love", which had a "succinct and demanding message about womanhood".

The success of "If You Had My Love", which was considered unlikely, coincided with the "Latin explosion" of 1999, which was led by Ricky Martin. Some critics assumed that Lopez was attempting to capitalize on the growing popularity of Latin music in the United States. Her subsequent success on the charts came as a surprise to critics; Herón Marquez wrote in Latin Sensations (2001) that it "made the popular actor even more popular. Suddenly, the music industry and the public were intrigued by this woman who seemed to have so many different talents." Chris Poppe, vice president of marketing for Epic Records, noted: "It was easy for the media to lump Jennifer into that, even though this is technically not a Latin album. It drew a lot of positive attention to 'If You Had My Love'. Radio reacted almost immediately to the song." Jennifer Charles from KSZR said, "If you had doubts about the idea of Jennifer Lopez as a recording artist, they were gone once the groove kicked in and she started to sing." The interest in Martin and Lopez was further credited with "boosting the profile of Latin music in Canada", and helped Sony Music Entertainment Canada launch another singer, Marc Anthony.

Considered iconic, a number of sources have listed "If You Had My Love" as one of Lopez's best songs. Complex magazine named the song her greatest hit in 2012. About.com music journalist Bill Lamb ranked the song as Lopez's best song, praising its "elegant feel laced with surging strings". AOL Radio listeners also chose it as her best song. A reporter from the International Business Times called the song "radio-friendly" and said it was her second best song behind "Love Don't Cost a Thing". Stacy Lambe of VH1 listed the song as Lopez's fifth best single, writing: "Lopez's debut single drew on everything that was popular in 1999. It fused together the synths made popular by TLC, highlighted the Latin flare made profitable by Ricky Martin and came packaged with Lopez's movie brand recognition and sex appeal. The pop song did what it was supposed to do, debuting at number 1 on the Billboard Hot 100 and announcing that Jennifer the singer had arrived." Bustle magazine writer Jordana Lipsitz called it one of the defining songs of the summer of 1999, adding: "This song was the jam you and your gal pals practiced your back up dancer routines with. Admit it." Rolling Stone included the song on a list of the "20 Biggest Songs of the Summer" from the 1990s. In 2012, Lewis Corner of Digital Spy described "If You Had My Love" as an "R&B classic", which serves as "a firm reminder of her fiercely independent but hopeless romantic nature, which seems to reflect her colourful personal life". Rapper T-Pain stated that it was the Darkchild remix of "If You Had My Love", which he recalled used Auto-Tune "for like a second", that inspired his use of the pitch correction processor. Canadian recording artist Drake sampled the song's chorus in "Teenage Fever", a song from his mixtape More Life (2017). American singer Melanie Martinez sampled the song on "Brain and Heart" off her After School EP, released in 2020.

== Track listing and formats ==
US CD and cassette single
No.	Title	Length
1.	"If You Had My Love"	4:28
2.	"No Me Ames" (Tropical remix with Marc Anthony)	5:05
Total length:		9:28

European maxi-CD single
No.	Title	Length
1.	"If You Had My Love" (radio edit)	3:47
2.	"If You Had My Love" (Pablo Flores remix edit)	3:54
3.	"If You Had My Love" (Dark Child Remix radio edit)	3:56
4.	"If You Had My Love" (Dark Child remix extended)	6:01
Total length:		17:38

UK cassette single
No.	Title	Length
1.	"If You Had My Love" (album version)	4:25
2.	"If You Had My Love" (Darkchild remix radio edit)	4:00
Total length:		8:25

US maxi-CD single and digital single; Japanese CD single
No.	Title	Length
1.	"If You Had My Love" (radio edit)	3:47
2.	"If You Had My Love" (Pablo Flores remix edit)	3:54
3.	"If You Had My Love" (Dark Child remix radio edit)	4:00
4.	"If You Had My Love" (Pablo Flores remix)	9:12
5.	"If You Had My Love" (Dark Child remix extended)	6:18
6.	"No Me Ames" (Tropical remix with Marc Anthony)	5:03

Australia maxi-CD single
No.	Title	Length
1.	"If You Had My Love" (radio edit)	3:47
2.	"If You Had My Love" (Dark Child remix 1)	4:01
3.	"If You Had My Love" (Master mix)	4:25
4.	"If You Had My Love" (Dark Child remix 2)	6:04
5.	"If You Had My Love" (Pablo Flores remix)	3:54

== Personnel ==
Personnel are adapted from the liner notes of On the 6 and Billboard.

- Chuck Bailey – assistant engineer
- Brian Calicchia – assistant engineer
- Larry Gold – strings arranger and conductor
- LaShawn Daniels – vocal producer, songwriter
- Franklyn Grant – engineer
- Shawnyette Harrell – background vocals
- Fred Jerkins III – songwriter
- Rodney Jerkins – producer, songwriter
- Jennifer “Jenny” Karr – background vocals
- Bill Makina – programming
- Glen Marchese – strings arranger
- Tony Maserati – mixer
- Cory Rooney – vocal producer, songwriter
- Robb Williams – strings arranger, assistant engineer

== Charts ==
=== Weekly charts ===
Weekly chart performance for "If You Had My Love"
Chart (1999)	Peak position
Australia (ARIA)	1
Austria (Ö3 Austria Top 40)	13
Belgium (Ultratop 50 Flanders)	9
Belgium (Ultratop 50 Wallonia)	3
Canada (Nielsen SoundScan)	1
Canada CHR (Nielsen BDS)	1
Canada Top Singles (RPM)	1
Canada Adult Contemporary (RPM)	1
Canada Dance/Urban (RPM)	1
Costa Rica (Notimex)	5
Czech Republic (IFPI)	5
Denmark (IFPI)	5
European Hot 100 Singles (Music & Media)	4
European Radio Top 50 (Music & Media)	1
Finland (Suomen virallinen lista)	1
France (SNEP)	4
Germany (GfK)	5
Greece (IFPI)	1
Honduras (Notimex)	2
Hungary (Mahasz)	1
Iceland (Íslenski Listinn Topp 40)	2
Ireland (IRMA)	8
Italy (FIMI)	3
Italy Airplay (Music & Media)	1
Netherlands (Dutch Top 40)	1
Netherlands (Single Top 100)	2
New Zealand (Recorded Music NZ)	1
Norway (VG-lista)	7
Poland Airplay (Music & Media)	2
Scottish Singles Sales (Official Charts)	5
Spain (Promusicae)	7
Sweden (Sverigetopplistan)	9
Switzerland (Schweizer Hitparade)	5
UK Singles (Official Charts)	4
UK Hip Hop/R&B (Official Charts)	2
US Billboard Hot 100	1
US Adult Pop Airplay (Billboard)	32
US Dance Club Songs (Billboard)	5
US Dance Singles Sales (Billboard)	1
US Hot R&B/Hip-Hop Songs (Billboard)	6
US Hot Latin Songs (Billboard)	27
US Pop Airplay (Billboard)	2
US Rhythmic Airplay (Billboard)	1

=== Year-end charts ===
Year-end chart performance for "If You Had My Love"
Chart (1999)	Position
Australia (ARIA)	16
Belgium (Ultratop 50 Flanders)	73
Belgium (Ultratop 50 Wallonia)	20
Brazil (Crowley)	48
Canada Top Singles (RPM)	10
Canada Adult Contemporary (RPM)	35
Canada Dance/Urban (RPM)	11
European Hot 100 Singles (Music & Media)	20
European Radio Top 100 (Music & Media)	6
France (SNEP)	15
Germany (Media Control)	32
Netherlands (Dutch Top 40)	31
Netherlands (Single Top 100)	23
New Zealand (RIANZ)	37
Norway End of School Period (VG-lista)	13
Romania (Romanian Top 100)	8
Sweden (Hitlistan)	54
Switzerland (Schweizer Hitparade)	15
UK Singles (OCC)	53
US Billboard Hot 100	12
US Adult Top 40 (Billboard)	96
US Hot R&B/Hip-Hop Singles & Tracks (Billboard)	46
US Mainstream Top 40 (Billboard)	10
US Maxi-Singles Sales (Billboard)	7
US Rhythmic Top 40 (Billboard)	7

=== Decade-end charts ===
Decade-end chart performance for "If You Had My Love"
Chart (1990–1999)	Position
US Billboard Hot 100	46

== Certifications ==
Certifications and sales for "If You Had My Love"
Region	Certification	Certified units/sales
Australia (ARIA)	2× Platinum	140,000^{‡}
Belgium (BRMA)	Platinum	50,000^{*}
France (SNEP)	Gold	300,000
Germany (BVMI)	Gold	250,000^{^}
New Zealand (RMNZ)	Platinum	10,000^{*}
New Zealand (RMNZ) Digital	Gold	15,000^{‡}
Sweden (GLF)	Gold	15,000^{^}
Switzerland (IFPI Switzerland)	Gold	25,000^{^}
United Kingdom (BPI)	Platinum	600,000^{‡}
United States (RIAA)	Platinum	1,200,000
Summaries
Europe	—	1,200,000
^{*} Sales figures based on certification alone.^{^} Shipments figures based on certification alone.^{‡} Sales+streaming figures based on certification alone.

== Release history ==
Release dates and formats for "If You Had My Love"
Region	Date	Format(s)	Label	Ref.
United States	May 4, 1999	Contemporary hit radio; rhythmic contemporary radio; urban contemporary radio	Work	
United States	May 11, 1999	CD	Work	
Germany	June 2, 1999	CD	Columbia	
United Kingdom	June 21, 1999	CD; cassette	Columbia	
Japan	June 23, 1999	CD	SME	
