= Jennifer Lopez: Let's Get Loud =

Video by Jennifer Lopez
- Released: February 11, 2003
- Genre: Latin pop; hip hop soul; R&B
- Length: 100 minutes
- Label: Epic
- Director: Hamish Hamilton
- Producer: Brad Lachman; Jennifer Lopez; Benny Medina; Jeff Pollack

Jennifer Lopez chronology
Jennifer Lopez: Feelin' So Good (2000)	Jennifer Lopez: Let's Get Loud (2003)	The Reel Me (2003)

Jennifer Lopez: Let's Get Loud is the first live long-form video by American recording artist and actress Jennifer Lopez, released in February 2003. The material is chosen from two concerts of the same name recorded at the Roberto Clemente Coliseum in Puerto Rico.

== Track listing ==
1. Introduction (music): Frankie Cutlass "Puerto Rico" Big Pun "Still Not a Player "
2. "Let's Get Loud"
3. "Ain't It Funny"
4. "Cariño"
5. "Play"
6. "Feelin' So Good"
7. "I'm Real
8. "Dancer Introductions"
9. Medley: "Secretly" / "Theme from Mahogany (Do You Know Where You're Going To)"
10. "I Could Fall in Love" (Selena cover)
11. "Si Ya Se Acabó"
12. "Band Introductions"
13. Medley: "Waiting for Tonight" / "Walking on Sunshine"
14. "If You Had My Love"
15. "Love Don't Cost a Thing"
16. "Plenarriqueña"

=== DVD bonus features ===
1. "Welcome to Puerto Rico"

== Certifications ==
Country	Certification
Germany	Gold
United States	Platinum
