= Pucker (disambiguation) =

Pucker is a brand of fruit-flavored liqueurs made by De Kuyper.

Pucker may also refer to:

- Peter Pucker (born 1988), Austrian soccer player
- Pucker! (Hairspray in the U.S.), a 1995 album by British band Selector
- Macular pucker or epiretinal membrane, an ocular disease
- Pucker (album), a 2013 album by jazz drummer Scott Amendola and guitarist Charlie Hunter
- The Pucker, nickname for Seán Ó Sé (1936–2026), Irish traditional singer

== See also ==
- Pucker Up (disambiguation)
