= J.Lo (album) =

Studio album by Jennifer Lopez
- Released: January 16, 2001
- Recorded: April–October 2000
- Studios: Cove City Sound Studios (Glen Cove, NY); Sony Music Studios (New York, NY); Murlyn Studios (Stockholm, Sweden); Daddy's House Recording Studios (New York, NY); Criteria Studios (Miami, FL); Lobo Recording Studios (Long Island, NY); Darkchild Studios (Pleasantville, NJ); Crescent Moon Studios (Miami, FL); The Hit Factory (New York, NY); Blue Sky Studios (Delmar, NY)
- Genres: Dance-pop; Latin; R&B
- Length: 61:38
- Languages: English; Spanish
- Label: Epic
- Producers: 7; Bag & Arnthor; Manny Benito; Kip Collins; Sean "P. Diddy" Combs; Ray Contreras; LaShawn "Big Shiz" Daniels; Guillermo Edghill Jr.; Rodney "Darkchild" Jerkins; Richie Jones; Joe Kelley; Jimmy Greco; Troy Oliver; Irv Gotti; L.E.S.; Jennifer Lopez; Guy Roche; Frank Rodriguez; Cory Rooney; Jose Sanchez; Dan Shea; Ric Wake; Mario "Yellow Man" Winans

Jennifer Lopez chronology
On the 6 (1999)	J.Lo (2001)	J to tha L–O! The Remixes (2002)

Singles from J.Lo
- 1. "Love Don't Cost a Thing" Released: November 13, 2000; 2. "Play" Released: March 20, 2001; 3. "I'm Real" Released: June 19, 2001; 4. "Ain't It Funny" Released: June 20, 2001

J.Lo is the second studio album by American singer Jennifer Lopez, released on January 16, 2001, by Epic Records. Lopez began recording the album in April 2000, enlisting producers such as Cory Rooney, Troy Oliver, Dan Shea and Sean Combs, all of whom she had worked with on her debut album On the 6 (1999). The album's title refers to the nickname given to her by fans, with Lopez describing it as an homage to her supporters. Drawing from her own experiences, Lopez included more personal songs on this album, which deals with themes of relationships, female empowerment and sex. J.Lo is a primarily dance-pop, Latin and R&B record which encompasses Latin pop, retro and contemporary pop.

J.Lo received generally mixed reviews from music critics, who criticized its manufactured sound, while praising its Spanish and dance material. Commercially, J.Lo debuted atop the US Billboard 200 the same week as her film The Wedding Planner opened at number one at the domestic box office. The album was certified quadruple platinum in the United States, making it her highest-selling to date, and became the sixth most successful album of the year worldwide.

"Love Don't Cost a Thing", released as the album's lead single on November 20, 2000, reached number 3 on the US Billboard Hot 100 and number one on the UK Singles Chart. The album's second single, "Play", reached the top twenty in most countries, including the United Kingdom where it reached number three. "I'm Real" was serviced to radio as the album's third on June 19, 2001. To further its success, record executives at Epic recruited Ja Rule of Murder Inc. Records to create a remix of the song, "I'm Real (Murder Remix)". The remix, which featured Ja Rule, shifted Lopez's musical style from pop to a more hip hop and urban-oriented sound. It was the number one song in the United States at the time of the September 11 attacks for five non-consecutive weeks. "Ain't It Funny" was released as the album's fourth and final single on June 20, 2001. The album has sold over eight million copies worldwide.

== Background ==
"It's been a couple of years since I finished my last album, so I feel like I have more experience with the whole music thing and I have more of a point of view as to exactly what I wanted to do on this album, as opposed to the last album, but I'm very excited about it."

— Lopez

Prior to the release of J.Lo, Lopez had joined an elite group of limited actors to crossover successfully into the music industry. Inspired to pursue a music career after playing Selena in a 1997 musical biopic about the late singer of the same time, Lopez was signed to The Work Group and released her debut album On the 6 in 1999. Initially, the entertainer planned to release music in Spanish, although Tommy Mottola, the head of Sony Music Entertainment at the time, suggested that she sing in English. Subsequently, Lopez along with Ricky Martin led a large group of Hispanics who had crossed over into mainstream music with English material, including Enrique Iglesias, Marc Anthony and Christina Aguilera. At the time, this was referred to by the media as a Latin pop crossover "explosion" and "ethnic boom". Musically, On the 6 explored a Latin soul genre, and featured Lopez singing about love. It produced the number-one hit "If You Had My Love", as well as "Waiting for Tonight", which reached the top ten in the United States, among other singles. The album itself was a success, reaching number eight in the United States and selling eight million copies by 2003.

In April 2000, MTV News reported that Lopez, who had just finished filming a romantic comedy entitled The Wedding Planner, would begin recording her second studio album after wrapping up filming for another film, Angel Eyes (2001). That August, Lopez told LaunchCast that the album would be titled My Passionate Journey. "I'm halfway done right now. Hopefully I'll have it out by October," she said. It was reported that Lopez's boyfriend at the time, Sean Combs, who co-produced some of the tracks on On the 6, would contribute to the album. Additionally, it was reported that Rodney Jerkins, who produced "If You Had My Love", was working with Lopez. She said "I've grown musically, vocally, and everything" and wanted her second album to "... be more of a reflection of who I am, my own experiences".

The album was tentatively titled The Passionate Journey and set for release in November 2000, with the first single scheduled for release in late September. Lopez revealed in August 2000: "I had a deadline, but then I went and did three movies. So I'd been writing it during the movies and getting it together. And now I'm in there recording it." Lopez eventually decided to name the album J.Lo, paying homage to a nickname her fans called her on the streets since the beginning of her career, "My fans call me J.Lo. Giving the album this title is my way of telling them that this is for them in appreciation of their support."

Prior to releasing the album, Lopez knew how important it was to "stay fresh", wanting to innovate the music industry. She decided to tweak her public image, dying her hair and changing her stage name to J.Lo. The album was released on January 23, 2001. Lopez had more "creative control" on J.Lo than On the 6, explaining: "I really felt like this time it was even more mine." Previously, she had been vocal in living her life while acknowledging her responsibility as a role model to youth. The entertainer stated, "I mean, I feel like you can't take on the responsibility of the world, you know? I think it's destructive [...] You start thinking, Oh God, I have to do this or do that. You have to live your life. I don't do drugs, I don't drink or smoke or do anything like that. So, those are the type of things that people like [in] role models: 'Oh, you can't be human.' You are human."

== Composition ==
J.Lo is a pop album with Latin, dance-pop and R&B influences. Lopez revealed, "I don't think what I make is real Latin pop. I make pop music that has some Latin influence." The album is more personal and romantic than her previous, with Lopez referring to the songs as a reflection on "what I've observed and witnessed my sisters and my girlfriends going through. The songs are about having a good time and not having a good time, or partying a lot and partying too much."

The album's opening track "Love Don't Cost a Thing", produced by Ric Wake, lyrically centers around a materialistic relationship. "I'm Real", composed by Lopez with Cory Rooney and Troy Oliver, has a retro vibe and was likened to music from Janet Jackson's album Control by Slant Magazine. The dance-pop track "Play", produced by Swedish producers Arnthor Birgisson and Anders Bagge, features back-up vocals on the chorus from recording artist Christina Milian, who also co-wrote the track with Rooney, Bagge, and Birgisson. In the track, Lopez pleads with a nightclub DJ to "play her favorite song" over a shuffling electric guitar and dance beat. Telegram & Gazette compared its sound to Madonna. "Walking on Sunshine" was considered a "techno-disco anthem", while "Ain't it Funny" is a Latin pop song that returns López to her Latin roots. Written by Lopez and Rooney, it contains lyrics about "creating the perfect romance in your mind, then facing reality when Mr. Right is less than ideal". "We Gotta Talk" has double-time beats and, lyrically, "prescribes communication and compromise to heal a romantic relationship".

J.Ló includes the Spanish songs "Cariño", "Si Ya Se Acabo" and "Dame (Touch Me)". "Cariño" is described by Lopez as a "cha-cha" inspired composition, with lyrics that refer to love and affection. "That's Not Me" is a dramatic song about self-empowerment with an arrangement consisting of an acoustic guitar and piano, as well as "skittering syncopations, layering half-speed vocal lines over double-speed runs". The album also features romantic ballads, which Rolling Stone and Slant Magazine drew comparisons with Jackson. "Come Over" is a song about "forbidden lust", whilst "Secretly" features Lopez singing about a "guy whom she can smell across the room".

=== Controversy ===
Both the original and remix versions of "I'm Real" generated controversy. The original version of "I'm Real" is based around a sample of the Yellow Magic Orchestra's song "Firecracker", using an interpolation throughout introduction and chorus. Tommy Mottola, in addition to being the head of Sony, was the head of Columbia Records, which recording artist Mariah Carey had left at the time. Mottola, Carey's ex-husband, heard the sampling of "Firecracker" in a trailer for Carey's musical film Glitter (2001). According to The Inc.'s Irv Gotti, Mottola knew of Carey's usage of the "Firecracker" sample, and attempted to have Lopez use the same sample before her. When the music publishers for "Firecracker" were questioned, they admitted Carey had licensed usage of the sample first, and Lopez had signed for it over one month later, under Mottola's arrangement.

Following the scandal, Carey was unable to use the sample. Also according to Gotti, Mottola contacted him with instructions to create an additional song that sounded exactly like another Glitter track he produced, titled "If We", featuring rappers Ja Rule and Nate Dogg. The result of this was the remixed version of "I'm Real", which received backlash for Lopez's use of the term nigga. In response, Lopez stated, "For anyone to think or suggest that I'm racist is really absurd and hateful to me. The use of the word in the song, it was actually written by Ja Rule, it was not meant to be hurtful to anybody." Later, Rule was confused as to why Lopez "received flack" for using the word. The rapper stated, "I think the whole thing, like everything else, is being blown out of proportion. She's not the first Latino to use that word on a record, and it's never been an issue before. I think it's just that she's a very high-profile star and it's something to let people get a chance to poke at her." Despite the controversy, J.Lo was reissued with the remix as a bonus track on July 24, 2001. The inclusion of the remix resulted in the reissue carrying a Parental Advisory warning—coupled with the fact that another song on the album, "Play", contains profanity—and a clean version of the album was also issued.

== Promotion ==
The audio CD of J.Lo was "equipped" with special technology, which allowed buyers to access exclusive bonus features via Lopez's official website. Fans could place their CD in their CD-ROM drive of a computer and go to the entertainer's website where they would "unlock" a "secret" area of the site, which would contain the features. Lopez appeared on various television shows and performed live on several occasions to promote the album. On January 12, 2001, the entertainer appeared on Top of the Pops, performing the singles "Love Don't Cost a Thing" and "Play". On January 24, Lopez appeared at the Virgin Megastore on Sunset Boulevard, Los Angeles. Fans who purchased the album at 12 a.m. only would exclusively be given the chance to get Lopez's autograph. Lopez traveled to Australia briefly to promote J.Lo. According to the Sydney Morning Herald who wrote about her visit years later, she arrived in "true superstar style", "Her press conference at the Boomerang mansion in Elizabeth Bay was an absolute circus of beefy security guards (watching over J.Lo's arrival by boat), gushing publicists and one of the largest entertainment media packs I've ever seen."

On February 10, 2001, Lopez was the musical guest and host of Saturday Night Live. She appeared in comedy sketches as well as performing songs from the album, in her second appearance on the television series. Elsewhere, she appeared on Live! with Regis, The Tonight Show with Jay Leno, The Late Show with David Letterman, Today and the 43rd Grammy Awards, among other television appearances. That February, Lopez performed "Love Don't Cost a Thing" and "Play" at a special Total Request Live event, CBS Sports Presents: MTV's TRL The Super Bowl Sunday, which occurred in Tampa, Florida at The NFL Experience theme park. At the 2001 MTV Video Music Awards, held days before 9/11 on September 6, Lopez performed "Love Don't Cost a Thing" as well as "I'm Real (Murder Remix)", where she was joined by Ja Rule.

During September 22–23, 2001, Lopez performed a set of two concerts in Puerto Rico, entitled Let's Get Loud. These served as the first concerts of her career, in which she was, "flanked by a 10-piece orchestra, a five-person choir and 11 dancers". It would later air as a special on NBC. Later, a DVD of the concert entitled Jennifer Lopez: Let's Get Loud was released on February 11, 2003, and was certified Gold by the Recording Industry Association of America for sales of 50,000.

== Singles ==
On November 16, 2000, Lopez globally premiered "Love Don't Cost a Thing" as the album's first single at the MTV Europe Video Music Awards. It was released as a single that December. The song received mixed feedback from critics. Entertainment Weekly noted its bold female empowerment message, while Slant Magazine called it a "cheap". "Love Don't Cost a Thing" was a wide commercial success, reaching the top ten of most music markets internationally; most notably reaching number one in the United Kingdom. It peaked at number three in the United States, making it her third top-ten hit at the time. The song's music video was directed by Paul Hunter. It featured Lopez frolicking on the beach after her wealthy lover stands her up once again. Cris Judd, who later became her second husband, appeared as a back-up dancer. Lopez and Judd became close during the video's production, and soon began a relationship after she split from Sean Combs.

"Play" was released on March 27, 2001, as the second single from J.Lo. Although not as successful as "Love Don't Cost a Thing", "Play" still performed well commercially, peaking at number 18 in the United States and number 3 in the United Kingdom. It performed strongly on the Hot 100 Airplay chart, reaching number seven. A Francis Lawrence-directed "futuristic" themed music video for "Play" was released. It similarly featured Judd as a back-up dancer. Eventually, a few months after, Judd would become her next husband.

On June 20, 2001, the Latin pop inspired "Ain't it Funny" was released as the third single from J.Lo. It was originally written for the soundtrack of The Wedding Planner, a film Lopez starred in. However, Adam Shankman, the director, chose not to include it in the film because it had too much Latin influence, and "Love Don't Cost a Thing" was used instead. Although "Ain't it Funny" did not chart on the Hot 100, it was a success worldwide, reaching the top ten in multiple countries, including the United Kingdom where it peaked at number three. It was her second consecutive single to reach number three there, after "Play". The song was used as background music in three television advertisements in Japan to promote the 2001 Subaru Legacy for a special campaign which was known as Three Keys Legacy. Lopez herself was also featured in all three ads.

That July, following the album's re-release with the addition of "I'm Real (Murder Remix)", the new track along with the original version of "I'm Real" were simultaneously released as one single. Two music videos of the song were produced. However, "I'm Real (Murder Remix)" had more of an impact on the charts. This allowed the single reached number one in the United States.

== Critical reception ==
Professional ratings
Aggregate scores
Source	Rating
Metacritic	52/100
Review scores
Source	Rating
AllMusic	3/5 stars
The Daily Telegraph	3/5 stars
Dotmusic	2.5/5 stars
E!	B−
Entertainment Weekly	C−
NME	3/10
Now	1/5 stars
Q	2/5 stars
Rolling Stone	2.5/5 stars
Rolling Stone Album Guide	2/5 stars
Slant Magazine	3/5 stars

J.Lo received mixed reviews from contemporary music critics. At Metacritic, which assigns a normalized rating out of 100 to reviews from mainstream critics, the album received an average score of 52 based on 11 reviews. Michael Padletta was positive in his review for Billboard, praising Lopez for "assembling a sophomore set that's brimming with irresistibly hip-hop spiked songs [...] The result is a set with hip, decidedly time-sensitive feel, which goes a long way toward giving Lopez the credibility she'll need to develop a long-term music career." He also praised Lopez's voice, writing that it "sounds more confident, as she takes more chances with a voice that is technically limited but well-suited to the material she handles". Amy Linden of Sonic.net particularly praised the album for being "a feisty, damn-I-know-I'm-all-that attitude, combined with pulsating, insistent beats that leap out of the speakers and make you wanna move". AllMusic's Stephen Thomas Erlewine gave the album a rating of three-out-of-five-stars, describing it as "essentially the same album" as On the 6 and was unfavorable of its running length. However, he noted, "it has just about the same number of strong songs, all of which sounding of a piece with 'On the [6]', which makes it a success on a certain level."

Sal Cinquemani of Slant Magazine named it "a mixed bag: part retro dance-pop, part prescription R&B, and part Latin", noting that her voice "seems best suited for dance-pop rather than R&B and, judging from this album, it's where her heart is too." In a more mixed review, Entertainment Weekly's Tom Sinclair wrote that Lopez "seems lost amid the cluttered, high-gloss arrangements", but stated that she "deserved props" for the album's Spanish language songs. Jon Pareles of Rolling Stone was also mixed, stating, "most of the music sounds like jigsaw puzzles: showers of tiny bits and pieces that interlock as complex, coherent songs." Jake Barnes of Yahoo! Music noted that Lopez "mostly sticks to a successful formula - R&B lite with a Latin touch, but said, "[n]one are great tunes in the way of, say, TLC's 'Waterfalls' but the Bronx born Lopez's enormous fanbase is sure to propel them into the top of the charts." NME's Christian Ward, on the other hand, was negative, calling it "a calculated assault on our post-Destiny's Child sensibilities, an hysterical but fatally flawed attempt to prove that this Lopez puppet can do anything her producers ask of her". Josh Freedom du Lac of Wall of Sound criticized it for sounding to identical to her debut album, claiming that it "stick[s] to the same set of sonic templates throughout the 15-track album, never making much effort to shift up the tempos, melodies, and structures", while Mike Ross of Canoe.ca was highly critical, comparing the music to cotton candy, "made from air, sugar and artificial color".

The album was nominated for Album of the Year at the ALMA Awards, and Foreign Pop Album of the Year at the Hungarian Music Awards.

== Commercial performance ==
J.Lo entered the US Billboard 200 and the Billboard Top R&B/Hip-Hop Albums chart at number one for the week ending January 31, 2001. It sold 272,300 copies in its opening week, which was described by Rolling Stone as "somewhat modest", given the "publicity machinery behind the album". Lopez ended The Beatles' eight-week run at number one with their greatest hits album 1 (2000). Lopez became the first female solo artist under Epic Records to reach the number one spot of the Billboard 200, joining other Epic artists such as Michael Jackson, Pearl Jam and Sly & the Family Stone among others. Additionally, J.Lo was the first number one album of the year 2001. During its second week, the album slipped to number two on the Billboard 200. In its third week, J.Lo sold 134,000 copies and fell to number four. MTV News reported its sales after three weeks of availability to have exceeded 586,000 copies. The following week, the album sold 130,000 copies, remaining in the chart's top five. For the Billboard issue of March 17, 2001, J.Lo dropped out of the chart's top ten, falling to number 17. For the week of April 7, 2001, J.Lo fell out of the Billboard 200's top 40.

After being re-released with the addition of the number one single "I'm Real (Murder Remix)", J.Lo experienced a boost in sales. It was certified triple platinum by the Recording Industry Association of America for shipments of three million copies. For the week of September 1, 2001, the album had re-entered the top ten at number ten, where it remained for two weeks. Overall, J.Lo was the eleventh best-selling record of the year in the United States, with sales of 3.03 million copies. On October 31, 2003, the album was certified quadruple platinum for shipments of four million copies in the United States. By February 2002, J.Lo had sold a total of 3.18 million units in the United States. In June 2013, Gary Trust of Billboard reported that J.Lo had sold a total of 3.8 million copies in the United States, making it her best-selling album.

J.Lo also experienced commercial success internationally. In Canada, the album sold 22,984 copies in its first week, and was certified platinum by the Canadian Recording Industry Association for shipments of 100,000. Additionally, it debuted and peaked atop the Canadian Albums Chart. In total, it sold 200,000 copies in Canada, certified double platinum. The album peaked at number two on the UK Albums Chart, and remains her most successful album there, remaining on the chart for 48 weeks. The album sold 27,000 copies in its first week in the United Kingdom, and sold 45,000 copies in the week preceding Christmas 2001. By December 7, 2002, J.Lo had sold 510,000 copies in the United Kingdom, and has been certified double platinum by the British Phonographic Industry for shipments of over 600,000 units. It has since sold over 606,500 units in the UK.

For the week commencing February 5, 2001, J.Lo was the highest-selling album throughout Europe. It also peaked at number one in Poland, Switzerland and Greece. The album had its longest European chart run in France. After entering and peaking at number six on the French Albums Chart, it spent a total of 70 weeks charting, last appearing on September 28, 2002, after two re-entries. Furthermore, it was Lopez's second album to be awarded with a gold certification for selling over 200,000 units there. J.Lo entered the Australian Albums Chart at number two on February 4, 2001. It remained in the top ten for six weeks, and in the top forty for 26 weeks including re-entries. It was certified double platinum by the Australian Recording Industry Association for sales of 140,000. J.Lo was certified double platinum in other countries including New Zealand and Switzerland. By May 2001, the album had sold five million copies worldwide. Globally, it was the sixth biggest album of 2001, with shipments of 6.8 million units according to Billboard magazine. By 2011, the album had sold a reported 8 million copies worldwide.

== Legacy ==
J.Lo remains the most commercially successful album of Lopez's career, and has been described as helping establish her as a pop icon. Having adopted J.Lo as her stage name at the time, it served as a "reminder that the mainstream success had not affected her connection with her roots". Several artists followed this trend, such as Janet Jackson with her album Damita Jo (2004) and Mariah Carey with The Emancipation of Mimi (2005). The album's title established Lopez's nickname as J.Lo, a portmanteau which was noted to have started a trend in celebrity nicknames. With the album's release, Lopez continued to transition into a sex symbol. J.Lo has also been described as the "springboard that took Lopez from performer to mogul", allowing her to launch her lifestyle brand J.Lo by Jennifer Lopez and first fragrance Glow by JLo.

The same week the album opened atop the Billboard 200, Lopez's feature film The Wedding Planner debuted at number one at the United States box office after grossing $13.5 million during its opening weekend. Writing for MTV News on the twentieth anniversary of the album's release, Yasmine Shemesh stated: "She's an icon — an important one. And J.Lo, with the reverberating impact it made, was a vital stepping stone in that path: Because of that album, those three letters are forever embedded in the vernacular of contemporary pop culture." Cole Delbyck, writing for HuffPost, also regards the album as "cementing her as a musical force to be reckoned with", describing it as a turning point in her career and personal life.

The release of "I'm Real (Murder Remix)" shifted Lopez toward a more pure R&B sound, with Complex writing that J.Lo led to her "embracing hip-hop adjacent vibes, an aesthetic she'd stick with for the early part of the decade." Speaking of the remix, Ja Rule stated, "It's J. Lo now because of 'I'm Real'. It's gonna put her in another zone. After this one, they gonna be expecting hot crossover R&B joints from J. Lo. They ain't gonna want the pop version of J. Lo no more, they gonna want the 'I'm Real' version." Shemesh stated that the success of Lopez's collaboration with Ja Rule "helped cement the lasting power of the pop/hip-hop composite", and regarded J.Lo as "contributing to the trajectory of early 2000s music". Writing for Entertainment Tonight, Chris Azzopardi also noted that the song "would influence future rap-pop collaborations" and laid "the foundation for Lopez's R&B-influenced music career." The accompanying music videos for "I'm Real (Murder Remix)" and "Love Don't Cost a Thing" are considered iconic, while the latter song inspired the title of the 2003 film of the same name, which featured the film debut of Christina Milian.

== Remix album ==
In December 2001, it was announced that Lopez would release a remix album. According to Cory Rooney, "We had changed the sound of Jennifer Lopez [with "I'm Real"] and we didn't have anything else on the [J.Lo] album we could release as a single. We had to do another remix to keep the momentum going." After the success of "I'm Real (Murder Remix)", Lopez once again recruited Ja Rule for a remix version of "Ain't It Funny". Prior to the release of J to tha L–O! The Remixes (2002), "Ain't It Funny (Murder remix)" was released and topped the Billboard Hot 100 for six weeks, making it one of the most successful singles of Lopez's career. The remix album debuted atop the Billboard 200 with first-week sales of 156,000 copies, thus becoming the first number one remix album in the United States.

== 25th Anniversary edition ==
In January 2026, it was announced that J.Lo (25th Anniversary Edition) would be released. It features new track "Crazy (Nobody Else)" as well as exclusive tracks only found on international editions. It also features a Trixie Mattel remix of "Play", co-remixed with Drew Louis.

== Track listing ==
J.Lo — Standard edition
No.	Title	Writer(s)	Producer(s)	Length
1.	"Love Don't Cost a Thing"	Damon Sharpe; Greg Lawson; Georgette Franklin; Jeremy Monroe; Amille D. Harris	Ric Wake; Richie Jones^{[a]}; Cory Rooney^{[a]}	3:42
2.	"I'm Real"	Jennifer Lopez; Troy Oliver; Rooney; Leshan Lewis; Martin Denny	Oliver; Rooney; L.E.S.	4:58
3.	"Play"	Anders Bagge; Arnthor Birgisson; Christina Milian; Rooney	Bag & Arnthor	3:31
4.	"Walking on Sunshine"	Lopez; Mario "Yellow Man" Winans; Sean "P. Diddy" Combs; Michael "Lo" Jones; Jack Knight; Karen Anderson; Adonis Shropshire; Mechalie Jamison	Combs; Winans; Rooney	3:46
5.	"Ain't It Funny"	Lopez; Rooney	Rooney; Dan Shea	4:05
6.	"Cariño"	Lopez; Rooney; Benito; Neal Creque; Jose Sanchez; Frank Rodriguez; Guillermo Edghill Jr.; Mongo Santamaria	Sanchez; Rodriguez; Edghill Jr.; Rooney	4:15
7.	"Come Over"	Combs; Michelle Bell; Kip Collins; Winans	Collins; Combs; Winans	4:52
8.	"We Gotta Talk"	Lopez; Tina Morrison; Rooney; Joe Kelley; Steve Estiverne; Oliver	Rooney; Oliver; Kelley^{[b]}	4:06
9.	"That's Not Me"	Combs; Winans; Kandice Love	Winans; Combs	4:31
10.	"Dance with Me"	Combs; Winans; Knight; Jones; Jamison	Winans; Combs	3:52
11.	"Secretly"	Lopez; Rooney; Oliver; Kalilah Shakir	Oliver; Rooney	4:25
12.	"I'm Gonna Be Alright"	Lopez; Rooney; Oliver; Lorraine Cheryl Cook; Ronald LaPread	Rooney; Oliver	3:43
13.	"That's the Way"	Rodney "Darkchild" Jerkins; LaShawn "Big Shiz" Daniels; Nora Payne; Fred Jerkins III	Darkchild; LaShawn Daniels^{[c]}	3:53
14.	"Dame (Touch Me)" (with Chayanne)	Benito; Jerkins; Jerkins III; Daniels; Mischke	Darkchild; Benito	4:23
15.	"Si Ya Se Acabó"	Benito; Jimmy Greco; Ray Contreras	Manny Benito; Greco; Contreras	3:36
Total length:				61:38

J.Lo — Spanish and Brazilian edition (bonus tracks)
No.	Title	Writer(s)	Producer(s)	Length
16.	"Amor Se Paga con Amor (Love Don't Cost a Thing)" (Spanish version)	Sharpe; Greg Lawson; Georgette Franklin; Jeremy Monroe; Amille D. Harris; Benito	Ric Wake; Jones^{[a]}; Rooney^{[a]}	3:44
17.	"Cariño" (Spanish version)	Lopez; Rooney; Benito; Creque; Sanchez; Rodriguez; Edghill Jr.; Santamaria	Sanchez; Rodriguez; Edghill Jr.; Rooney	4:15
18.	"Qué Ironía (Ain't It Funny)" (Spanish version)	Lopez; Rooney; Benito	Rooney; Shea	4:05
Total length:				73:42

J.Lo — Japanese edition (bonus track)
No.	Title	Writer(s)	Producer(s)	Length
16.	"I'm Waiting"	Combs; Winans; Jack Knight; Jones; Mechalie Jamison	Winans; Combs	3:11
Total length:				64:49

J.Lo — Reissued edition^{[d]} (bonus track)
No.	Title	Writer(s)	Producer(s)	Length
16.	"I'm Real (Murder Remix)" (featuring Ja Rule)	Lopez; Oliver; Rooney; Lewis; Atkins; Lorenzo; James	Irv Gotti; 7	4:22
Total length:				66:00

J.Lo — Special limited edition fan pack and Malaysian edition (bonus tracks)
No.	Title	Writer(s)	Producer(s)	Length
16.	"I'm Real (Murder Remix)" (featuring Ja Rule)	Lopez; Oliver; Rooney; Lewis; Atkins; Lorenzo; James	Irv Gotti; 7	4:22
17.	"Can't Believe" (hidden track)		Soulshock and Karlin	4:43
Total length:				70:43

J.Lo — European special edition and 2020 LP edition (bonus tracks)
No.	Title	Writer(s)	Producer(s)	Length
16.	"Pleasure Is Mine"	Shelly Peiken; Guy Roche	Roche	4:17
17.	"I'm Waiting"	Combs; Winans; Jack Knight; Jones; Mechalie Jamison	Winans; Combs	3:11
18.	"I'm Real (Murder Remix)" (featuring Ja Rule)	Lopez; Oliver; Rooney; Lewis; Atkins; Lorenzo; James	Irv Gotti; 7	4:22
Total length:				73:28

J.Lo — Special limited edition fan pack (bonus cassette)^{[e]}
No.	Title	Writer(s)	Producer(s)	Length
1.	"Play" (Thunderpuss Radio Mix)	Bagge; Birgisson; Milian; Rooney	Bag & Arnthor	3:17
2.	"Love Don't Cost a Thing" (Schoolyard Mix)	Sharpe; Greg Lawson; Georgette Franklin; Jeremy Monroe; Amille D. Harris	Wake; Jones^{[a]}; Rooney^{[a]}	4:02
Total length:				7:19

J.Lo — US Trans World Entertainment exclusive limited edition (bonus disc)
No.	Title	Writer(s)	Producer(s)	Length
1.	"Pleasure Is Mine"	Peiken; Roche	Roche	4:17
2.	"Amor Se Paga con Amor (Love Don't Cost a Thing)" (Spanish version)	Sharpe; Greg Lawson; Georgette Franklin; Jeremy Monroe; Amille D. Harris; Manny Benito	Wake; Jones^{[a]}; Rooney^{[a]}	3:44
Total length:				8:01

J.Lo — 25th Anniversary Edition
No.	Title	Writer(s)	Producer(s)	Length
17.	"Crazy (Nobody Else)"	Rodney Jerkins; Fred Jerkins III; LaShawn Daniels; Mischke	Rodney Jerkins	4:15
18.	"Can't Believe"	Soulshock; Karlin; Shamora Crawford	Soulshock & Karlin	4:44
19.	"Play" (Trixie Mattel Remix)	Milian; Birgisson; Bagge; Rooney	Bag & Arnthor; Mattel; Drew Louis	3:29
20.	"Ain't It Funny (Murder Remix)" (featuring Ja Rule and Caddillac Tah)	Ashanti; Ja Rule; Caddillac Tah; 7 Aurelius; Irv Gotti; Rooney; Easy Mo Bee; Craig Mack	7 Aurelius; Irv Gotti	3:53
21.	"Amor Se Paga con Amor (Love Don't Cost a Thing)" (Spanish version)	Damon Sharpe; Amille D. Harris; Greg Lawson; Georgette Franklin; Jeremy Monroe	Rooney; Richie Jones; Marc Russell; Ric Wake	3:42
22.	"Qué Ironía (Ain't It Funny)" (Spanish version)	Manny Benito; Rooney; Jennifer Lopez	Rooney; Dan Shea	4:07
23.	"Cariño" (Spanish version)	Big Joon!; Frank Rodriguez; Rooney; Lopez; Jose Sanchez; Benito; Neal Creque	Big Joon!; Jose Sanchez; Frank Rodriguez	4:17
24.	"Touch Me (Dame)" (with Chayanne; English version)	Jerkins; Daniels; Fred Jerkins III; Mischke	Jerkins	4:35
25.	"Pleasure Is Mine"	Guy Roche; Shelley Peiken	Guy Roche	4:19
26.	"I'm Waiting"	Michael Carlos Jones; Mechalie Jamison; Jack Knight; Mario Winans; Diddy; Keisha Spivey; Adonis	Diddy; Mario Winans	3:11
Total length:				106:51

Notes

- ^{^a} signifies an additional producer
- ^{^b} signifies an co-producer
- ^{^c} signifies a vocal producer
- ^{^d} The United States releases of J.Lo feature the explicit versions of "Play" and "I'm Real (Murder Remix)", while most international editions replace the songs with the radio versions. No releases of any edition of J.Lo have an explicit label included on the cover, except for the North American reissue of the album.
- ^{^e} Second cassette plays the same tracks on both sides. (C and D)

== Personnel ==
Musicians

- Jennifer Lopez – lead vocals
- Karen Anderson – backing vocals
- Michelle Bell – backing vocals
- Manny Benito – backing vocals
- Jeannie Cruz – backing vocals
- William Dubal – backing vocals
- Kip Collins – instrumentation
- Angel Fernandez – guitar
- Mario Gonzalez – guitar
- Ricky Gonzalez – piano, backing vocals
- Jimmy Greco – keyboards
- Nelson Gasu Jaime – piano
- Richie Jones – drums
- Ozzie Melendez – trombone, horn
- Christina Milian – backing vocals
- Troy Oliver – instrumentation
- Nora Payne – backing vocals
- Erben Perez – bass
- Lena Pérez – backing vocals
- Paul Pesco – guitar
- Corey Rooney – backing vocals
- Shelene Thomas – backing vocals
- Rene Toledo – guitar
- Mario Winans – backing vocals
- Yanko – backing vocals

Production

- Jennifer Lopez – executive producer
- Arnthor Birgisson – producer
- Scott Barnes – make-up
- Manny Benito – engineer, producer
- Jorge Calandrelli – string arrangements
- Kip Collins – producer
- Sean "Puffy" Combs – producer, mixing
- Ray Contreras – producer, arranger
- Angel Fernandez – arranger
- Paul Foley – engineer
- Jimmy Greco – producer, arranger, drum programming
- Dan Hetzel – engineer, mixing
- Jean-Marie Horvat – mixing
- Richie Jones – producer, arranger, mixing, programming
- Jack Knight – arranger
- Matt Kormondy – production assistant
- Greg Lawson – arranger, programming
- Glen Marchese – engineer
- Rob Martinez – production assistant
- Tony Maserati – mixing
- William Nelson – production assistant
- Joel Numa – engineer, string engineer
- Troy Oliver – producer, programming, drum programming, keyboard programming
- Michael Patterson – engineer, mixing
- Julian Peploe – art direction, design
- Cory Rooney – producer, executive producer, arranger, drum programming, keyboard programming
- José R. Sanchez – producer, programming, drum programming, keyboard programming
- Dave "Young Dave" Scheur – engineer
- Dan Shea – producer, programming
- Cesar Sogbe – mixing
- Manelich Sotolong – assistant engineer
- David Swope – engineer, assistant engineer, mixing assistant
- Michael Hart Thompson – photography
- J.C. Ulloa – engineer
- Rick Wake – producer, arranger
- Mario Winans – producer, instrumentation
- Joe Zee – stylist

== Charts ==
=== Weekly charts ===
Weekly chart performance for J.Lo
Chart (2001)	Peak position
Argentine Albums (CAPIF)	1
Australian Albums (ARIA)	2
Australian Dance Albums (ARIA)	1
Australian Urban Albums (ARIA)	1
Austrian Albums (Ö3 Austria)	3
Belgian Albums (Ultratop Flanders)	3
Belgian Albums (Ultratop Wallonia)	4
Canadian Albums (Billboard)	1
Canadian R&B Albums (Nielsen SoundScan)	2
Chilean Albums (IFPI)	1
Danish Albums (Hitlisten)	15
Dutch Albums (Album Top 100)	4
European Albums (Billboard)	1
Finnish Albums (Suomen virallinen lista)	6
French Albums (SNEP)	6
German Albums (Offizielle Top 100)	1
Greek Albums (IFPI)	1
Hungarian Albums (MAHASZ)	15
Icelandic Albums (Tónlist)	5
Irish Albums (IRMA)	6
Italian Albums (FIMI)	5
Japanese Albums (Oricon)	14
New Zealand Albums (RMNZ)	3
Norwegian Albums (VG-lista)	15
Polish Albums (ZPAV)	1
Scottish Albums (Official Charts)	7
Slovak Albums (SNS IFPI)	3
South African Albums (RiSA)	6
South Korean Albums (RIAK)	7
Spanish Albums (PROMUSICAE)	1
Swedish Albums (Sverigetopplistan)	7
Swiss Albums (Schweizer Hitparade)	1
UK Albums (Official Charts)	2
UK R&B Albums (Official Charts)	1
US Billboard 200	1
US Top R&B/Hip-Hop Albums (Billboard)	1
US Top Internet Albums (Billboard)	2

Weekly chart performance for J.Lo (25th Anniversary Edition
Chart (2026)	Peak position
UK Album Downloads (OCC)	59

=== Year-end charts ===
Year-end chart performance for J.Lo
Chart (2001)	Position
Australian Albums Chart	21
Australian Urban Albums Chart	4
Austrian Albums Chart	30
Belgian Albums Chart (Wallonia)	17
Belgian Albums Chart (Flandres)	17
Canadian Albums (Nielsen SoundScan)	10
Canadian R&B Albums (Nielsen SoundScan)	4
Danish Albums Chart	88
Dutch Albums Chart	15
European Albums (Music & Media)	14
Finnish Foreign Albums Chart	20
French Albums Chart	40
German Albums (Offizielle Top 100)	8
Hungarian Albums Chart	20
Italian Albums Chart	31
New Zealand Albums Chart	32
South Korean Foreign Albums Chart	44
Spanish Albums Chart (AFYVE)	24
Spanish Foreign Albums Chart (AFYVE)	5
Swedish Albums Chart	57
Swiss Albums Chart	8
UK Albums Chart	30
US Billboard 200	22
US Billboard Top R&B/Hip-Hop Albums	37
Worldwide Albums (IFPI)	6

Chart (2002)	Position
Australian Albums Chart	86
Australian Urban Albums Chart	8
Canadian Albums (Nielsen SoundScan)	102
Canadian R&B Albums (Nielsen SoundScan)	18
UK Albums Chart	187
US Billboard 200	88

=== Decade-end charts ===
Chart (2000–09)	Position
US Billboard 200	87

== Certifications ==
Region	Certification	Certified units/sales
Argentina (CAPIF)	Gold	20,000^{^}
Australia (ARIA)	2× Platinum	140,000^{^}
Austria (IFPI Austria)	Gold	20,000^{*}
Belgium (BRMA)	Platinum	50,000^{*}
Brazil (Pro-Música Brasil)	Gold	50,000^{*}
Canada (Music Canada)	2× Platinum	282,348
Finland (Musiikkituottajat)	Gold	19,596
France (SNEP)	2× Gold	200,000^{*}
Germany (BVMI)	Platinum	400,000
Greece (IFPI Greece)	Platinum	30,000^{^}
Indonesia	Platinum	50,000
Japan (RIAJ)	Gold	300,000
Mexico (AMPROFON)	Gold	80,000
Netherlands (NVPI)	Platinum	80,000^{^}
New Zealand (RMNZ)	2× Platinum	30,000^{^}
New Zealand (RMNZ) Digital	Gold	7,500^{‡}
Norway (IFPI Norway)	Gold	25,000^{*}
Poland (ZPAV)	Gold	50,000^{*}
South Africa (RISA)	2× Platinum	100,000^{*}
South Korea	—	35,255
Spain (Promusicae)	2× Platinum	200,000^{^}
Sweden (GLF)	Gold	40,000^{^}
Switzerland (IFPI Switzerland)	2× Platinum	80,000^{^}
United Kingdom (BPI)	2× Platinum	600,000
United States (RIAA)	4× Platinum	4,000,000^{^}
Summaries
Europe (IFPI)	2× Platinum	2,000,000^{*}
Worldwide	—	8,000,000
^{*} Sales figures based on certification alone.^{^} Shipments figures based on certification alone.^{‡} Sales+streaming figures based on certification alone.

== Release history ==
Region	Date	Edition	Format(s)	Label
Spain	January 16, 2001	Standard	CD	Sony
Germany	January 22, 2001	Standard	CD	Sony
United Kingdom	January 22, 2001	Standard	CD	Sony
Japan	January 24, 2001	Special	CD	Sony
Various	January 16, 2026	25th anniversary	Digital download; streaming	Sony; Legacy
Various	April 17, 2026	25th anniversary	2LP vinyl	Sony; Legacy

== See also ==
- 2001 in music
- List of Billboard 200 number-one albums of 2001
