= Guillermo Edghill Jr. =

Guillermo Edghill Jr
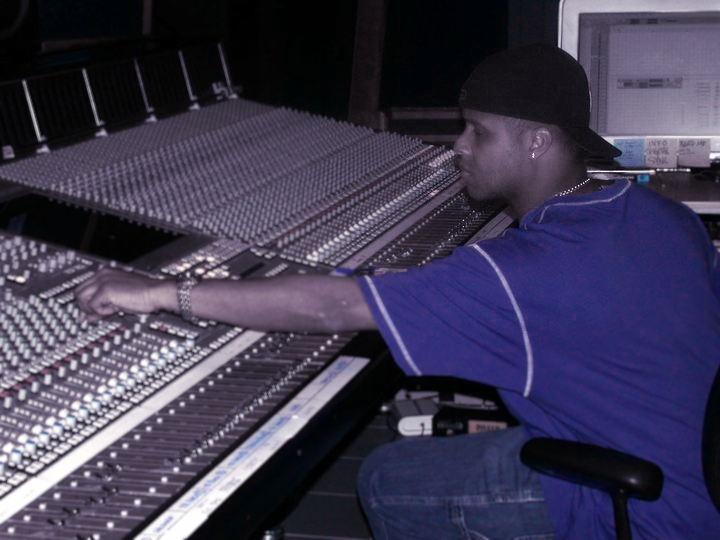
- Guillermo Edghill Jr engineering Jenny From The Block at The Hit Factory, New York City in 2002

Background information
- Also known as: BiG JooN!
- Born: Guillermo Edghill Jr; New York, NY
- Origin: Astoria, New York, United States
- Genres: Hip-Hop, R&B, Trap, Urban Pop, Pop, House, Salsa, Country
- Occupations: Record producer, mix engineer, programmer, recording engineer, remixer, songwriter, arranger and musician
- Instruments: Piano, Guitar, Drums, Pro Tools, Logic Pro
- Years active: 1993–present
- Labels: Sony, Epic, JIVE, RCA, Columbia; publisher: Kid From Queens Publishing; BMI
- Website: MixYourHit.com, TheBiGJooN.com

Guillermo Edghill Jr (p.k.a. Big Joon, stylized as BiG JooN!) is an American record producer, mix engineer, programmer, recording engineer, remixer, composer, arranger, instrumentalist and musician from New York City. He has worked with recording artists such as araabMUZIK, Mark Battles, Jarren Benton, Tamar Braxton, Mariah Carey, Ginuwine, Jay-Z, Jennifer Lopez, and Mims, and on hit records including Always Be My Baby, Candy Rain, Jenny From The Block, and SWV's You're The One.

JooN has collaborated with and/or consulted for Grammy Award-nominated or winning producers !llmind, Dr. Luke, Allen "AllStar" Gordon, Max Martin, Troy Oliver, Rockwilder, Cory Rooney, Trackmasters, and Bryce Wilson.

His work has been featured on gold, platinum and multi-platinum albums and singles, led to artists acquiring 14 major label recording and publishing deals and has landed 37 major label song placements and 44 altogether. Projects he has worked on have sold over 20 million units worldwide and have over 100 million views/plays on the internet.

He is currently a producer-engineer at MixYourHit and Rakateer Music in New York City.

== Discography ==
Year	Artist	Title (Album)	Record label(s)	Credit(s)	Studio(s)
2020	J-Horton	Stand Up And Be Counted	GruvGate Records	Mix/Mastering Engineer	The JooN JooN Room!, Queens, NY
2018	AraabMuzik	Trap V. Drill V. EDM	Genre Defying Entertainment	Mastering Engineer	The JooN JooN Room!, Queens, NY
2018	AraabMuzik	Goon Loops 2	Genre Defying Entertainment	Mastering Engineer	The JooN JooN Room!, Queens, NY
2018	Loki Ogie	Lies feat. Jarren Benton		Mix/Mastering Engineer	The JooN JooN Room!, Queens, NY
2018	Loki Ogie	Upset feat. Jarren Benton		Mix/Mastering Engineer	The JooN JooN Room!, Queens, NY
2017	Loki Ogie	Exposed feat. Mark Battles		Mix Engineer/Mastering Engineer	The JooN JooN Room!, Queens, NY
2017	AraabMuzik	ONE of ONE	Genre Defying Entertainment	Mastering Engineer	The JooN JooN Room!, Queens, NY
2016	Lenny Fontana feat. D-Train	When You Feel What Love Has	Karmic Power Records	Recording/Mix Engineer/Programmer/Keyboards	Karmic Power Studios, Baldwin, NY
2016	Bolly	2 Stoves feat. Prodigy		Recording/Mix/Mastering Engineer	Queens Green Room, Springfield Gardens, NY
2015	Meli'sa Morgan	So Good	RFC/Fresh Records	Recording/Mix Engineer/Programmer/Keyboards/Horn Arrangement	Karmic Power Studios, Baldwin, NY
2015	Lenny Fontana feat. D-Train	Raise Your Hands	Karmic Power Records	Recording/Mix Engineer//Programmer/Keyboards	Karmic Power Studios, Baldwin, NY
2015	Lenny Fontana	Chocolate Sensation	Cr2 Records/Karmic Power Records	Mix Engineer/Programmer	Karmic Power Studios, Baldwin, NY
2014	Lenny Fontana	Believe	Nervous Records/Karmic Power Records	Programmer/Keyboards	Karmic Power Studios, Baldwin, NY
2013	Silver Spoon Brun	Too Much For You (feat. LaChardon & Nyemiah Supreme) (Ladies First)	Well Written Music	Mix/Mastering Engineer	The Dormroom, Queens Village, NY
2013	Silver Spoon Brun	Do It For You (feat. Tamar Braxton) (Ladies First)	Well Written Music	Mix/Mastering Engineer	The Dormroom, Queens Village, NY
2013	Lenny Fontana pres. Dee Wiz & Universal Sounds Band	Music Makes You Wanna	Karmic Power Records	Mix Engineer	Karmic Power Studios, Baldwin, NY
2011	The Oprah Winfrey Show	Rock Goddesses of the 70s & 80s (Salt-N-Pepa Performance)		Audio Engineer	Gavfam Studio, Melville, NY
2009	Adrienne Bailon	Only You feat. Jay Z (Demo)		Producer/Composer/Arranger	Gavfam Studio, Melville, NY
2007	Mims	Just Like That (Music Is My Savior)	American King Music, Disturbing tha Peace, Capitol Records	Recording/Creative Engineer	The Penthouse Studio, Glen Cove, NY
2007	Mims	Big Black Train (Music Is My Savior)	American King Music, Disturbing tha Peace, Capitol Records	Recording/Creative Engineer	The Penthouse Studio, Glen Cove, NY
2007	Rissi Palmer	Hold on To Me (Rissi Palmer)	1720 Entertainment	Audio Engineer	The Poolhouse, Old Brookville, NY
2004	Frankee	I Told You So (The Good, the Bad, the Ugly)	Universal TV / Marro	Recording Engineer	Digital Bitch Studios, White Plains, NY
2004	Frankee	How You Do (The Good, the Bad, the Ugly)	Universal TV / Marro	Recording/Audio Engineer	Digital Bitch Studios; White Plains, NY, Sony Studios, New York, NY
2003	Ginuwine	Get Ready (feat. Snoop Dogg) (The Senior)	Epic Records	Recording Engineer	The Hit Factory Criteria, Miami, NY
2003	Ginuwine	Chedda Brings (feat. Jose Cenquentez) (The Senior)	Epic Records	Recording Engineer	The Hit Factory Criteria, Miami, NY
2003	Ginuwine	On My Way (Sex Interlude) (The Senior)	Epic Records	Recording Engineer	The Hit Factory Criteria, Miami, NY
2003	Ginuwine	Big Plans (feat. Method Man) (The Senior)	Epic Records	Recording Engineer	The Hit Factory Criteria, Miami, NY
2002	Jennifer Lopez	Jenny from the Block (This Is Me... Then)	Epic Records	Recording/Creative Engineer	The Hit Factory, New York, NY
2001	Jennifer Lopez	Cariño (J.Lo)	Epic Records	Producer/Composer/Arranger	Sony Studios, New York, NY
2001	Beres Hammond	Dance 4 Me (feat. Wyclef Jean) (GB Mix)	VP Records	Remixer/Keyboards	HC&F Studios, Freeport, NY
2000	BB Jay	His Love (Universal Concussion) (WOW Gospel 2001)	Jive Records and Verity Records	Producer/Keyboards	Swing Central Station, Corona, NY; Battery Studios, New York, NY
2000	BB Jay	Word Iz Bond (Universal Concussion) (WOW Gospel 2000)	Jive Records and Verity Records	Remixer/Keyboards	Swing Central Station, Corona, NY; Battery Studios, New York, NY
2000	BB Jay	The Raucous (Universal Concussion)	Jive Records	Producer/Keyboards	Swing Central Station, Corona, NY; Battery Studios, New York, NY
2000	BB Jay	I Told You So (Universal Concussion)	Jive Records	Producer/Keyboards	Swing Central Station, Corona, NY; Battery Studios, New York, NY
2000	BB Jay	Universal Concussion (Universal Concussion)	Jive Records	Producer/Composer/Arranger/Keyboards	Swing Central Station, Corona, NY; Battery Studios, New York, NY
2000	BB Jay	Don't Be Mad (Who Da' Blame) (Universal Concussion)	Jive Records	Remixer/Keyboards	Swing Central Station, Corona, NY; Battery Studios, New York, NY
2000	BB Jay	For The Ladies (Universal Concussion)	Jive Records	Remixer/Keyboards	Swing Central Station, Corona, NY; Battery Studios, New York, NY
2000	BB Jay	Out of Control (Universal Concussion)	Jive Records	Remixer/Keyboards	Swing Central Station, Corona, NY; Battery Studios, New York, NY
2000	BB Jay	One Way Ladies (Universal Concussion)	Jive Records	Remixer/Keyboards	Swing Central Station, Corona, NY; Battery Studios, New York, NY
2000	BB Jay	Hot Ta' Def (Universal Concussion)	Jive Records	Remixer/Keyboards	Swing Central Station, Corona, NY; Battery Studios, New York, NY
2000	BB Jay	Ain't What I Used To Be (Universal Conussion)	Jive Records	Producer/Keyboards	Swing Central Station, Corona, NY; Battery Studios, New York, NY
2000	BB Jay	Okeedoke (Universal Concussion)	Jive Records	Producer/Keyboards	Swing Central Station, Corona, NY; Battery Studios, New York, NY
2000	BB Jay	Po' No Mo (Universal Concussion)	Jive Records	Remixer/Keyboards	Swing Central Station, Corona, NY; Battery Studios, New York, NY
1999	Jennifer Lopez	Es Amor (On the 6 – Spanish Edition)	Work/Sony Music Entertainment	Producer/Composer/Arranger/Keyboards	Swing Central Station, Corona, NY; Sony Studios, New York, NY
1998	Nicole Renée	Strawberry (Nicole Renée)	Atlantic Records	Composer/Arranger	Swing Central Station, Corona, NY; Chung King Studios, New York, NY
1997	Room Service	Ain't Nuthin' Wrong	East West Records America	Producer/Composer/Arranger	Swing Central Station, Corona, NY; Giant Studios, New York, NY
1997	Keystone	I Wanna Be Where You Are (A Tear Falls in Brooklyn)	Qwest Records	Producer/Composer/Arranger	Swing Central Station, Corona, NY; Giant Studios, New York, NY
1996	One and One	Phenomenon	Next Plateau Entertainment	Producer/Composer/Arranger	Swing Central Station, Corona, NY
1996	The Cover Girls	Satisfy (Satisfy)	Quality Records	Producer/Composer/Arranger	Swing Central Station, Corona, NY; Soul Convention Studios, Rosedale, NY
1996	Hasan the Love Child	All About The Money	Epic Records	Producer/Composer/Arranger	Swing Central Station, Corona, NY; Sony Studios, New York, NY
1996	SWV	96 Anthem – You're The One (AllStar Remix) (featuring Lost Boyz, Busta Rhymes, Smoothe da Hustler & Trigger tha Gambler)	RCA Records	Remixer	Swing Central Station, Corona, NY; Sound on Sound Studios, New York, NY
1996	SWV	You're The One (Special Mix with Hook & Rappers From The Remix) (feat. Jay-Z, Lost Boyz, Busta Rhymes, Smoothe da Hustler & Trigger tha Gambler)	RCA Records	Remixer	Swing Central Station, Corona, NY; Sound on Sound Studios, New York, NY
1996	Tevin Campbell	I Got It Bad (AllStar Remix)	Qwest Records	Remixer/Keyboards	Quad Recording Studios, New York, NY
1995	Mariah Carey	Always Be My Baby (Reggae Soul Mix) (feat. Lil' Vicious)	Columbia Records	Remixer/Programming	Swing Central Station, Corona, NY; Sony Studios, New York, NY
1995	Kool G Rap	It's A Shame (Soul Mix)	Cold Chillin' Records / Epic Records / Sony Music Entertainment	Remixer/Programming	Swing Central Station, Corona, NY; Soul Convention, Rosedale, NY
1994	Soul for Real	Candy Rain (Corona Mix)	Uptown Records	Remixer/Keyboards	Swing Central Station, Corona, NY
1993	Menageri	Now I Realize (Swing of Things Remix)	Columbia Records	Remixer	Swing Central Station, Corona, NY; Soul Convention, Rosedale, NY
