= I'm Real =

2001 single by Jennifer Lopez

Single by Jennifer Lopez

from the album J.Lo
- B-side: "Let's Get Loud"; "Love Don't Cost a Thing"
- Released: June 19, 2001
- Recorded: 2000–2001
- Studio: Daddy's House (New York City); Criteria (Miami, Floria)
- Genre: Synth-pop; R&B
- Length: 4:58
- Label: Epic
- Songwriters: Jennifer Lopez; Troy Oliver; Cory Rooney; Leshan Lewis; Martin Denny
- Producers: Troy Oliver; Cory Rooney; L.E.S.

Jennifer Lopez singles chronology
"Play" (2001)	"I'm Real" (2001)	"Ain't It Funny" (2001)

Music video
- "I'm Real" on YouTube

"I'm Real" is a song by American actress and singer Jennifer Lopez from her second studio album, J.Lo (2001). The song was released as the album's third single. The track was well received by music critics, who complimented the 1980s-esque style and composition. A music video was made for the track, with the video depicting Lopez driving a motorcycle on a highway and featuring a dance break.

== Background and release ==
"I'm Real" was recorded by Jennifer Lopez for her second studio album, J.Lo (2001) which had 14 other tracks. Released on January 23, 2001, J.Lo became a commercial success, debuting at the summit of the Billboard 200. Describing J.Lo as a "reflection of who I am, my own experiences", Lopez said: "My fans call me J.Lo. Giving the album this title is my way of telling them that this is for them in appreciation of their support." Prior to its release, she knew how important it was to "stay fresh", and decided to tweak her public image by dying her hair and changing her stage name to J.Lo. Lopez felt that she had more "creative control" on J.Lo than her debut album, On the 6 (1999).

== Writing and recording ==
"I'm Real"
A thirty-second sample of the original version of "I'm Real", which uses an interpolation of Yellow Magic Orchestra's song "Firecracker". Sean Combs can be heard stating, "She's a bad, bad bitch."

"Firecracker"
A sample of "Firecracker" from the 1978 album Yellow Magic Orchestra by the band of the same name. This song was sampled in the album version of "I'm Real".

"I'm Real" was written by Jennifer Lopez, Troy Oliver, Cory Rooney and Leshan David Lewis, with production being handled by Oliver and Rooney. Lyrically, the singer offers voluptuous good times as long as her lover "don't ask me where I've been." While she brags that she's made him fall in love, a male voice chants, "She's a bad, bad bitch." Oliver developed the song's concept while Lewis claims to have suggested the use of a loop from the song "Firecracker" (1978) by Japanese band Yellow Magic Orchestra from their self-titled album. After hearing the instrumental track, Lopez and Rooney wrote "I'm Real", which she said "was the first time I ever wrote a melody. I just love the hook of the song. I wrote it, so it’s kind of personal." Lopez recorded the song that day, and called in her boyfriend at the time Sean Combs to record the lyric, "She's a bad, bad bitch." Rooney revealed: "She wrote that and she had him stop what he was doing, leave his studio, come across town and just go in the vocal booth and say that one part. Then she said, 'OK, now you can leave.'"

== Critical response ==
The song received mostly positive reviews from music critics. Stephen Thomas Erlewine of AllMusic picked the song as one of his "track picks", noting that the song has "hook, but it needs a couple of spins before its catch holds". While saying that the song "sound like it's straight out of 1986", Sal Cinquemani of Slant Magazine called it "a retro pop track reminiscent of Janet Jackson's Control era". Tom Sinclair of Entertainment Weekly called it "a chirpy little synth pop number".

== Chart performance ==
=== United States ===
"I'm Real" debuted at number 66 on the U.S. Billboard Hot 100 on the week ending July 7, 2001, earning the "Hot Shot Debut of the Week" title and debuting on the Billboard Hot 100 Airplay at number 55. "I'm Real" jumped to number 40 in its second week on the Hot 100 and moved up to number 32 on the Hot 100 Airplay chart. In its third week, the song continued to steadily increase, reaching number 25 on the Hot 100 and 20 on the Hot 100 Airplay chart. By its fourth week, the song had reached the top twenty, fueled by increasing airplay. On September 8, 2001, "I'm Real" replaced Alicia Keys' "Fallin'" as the leader of both the Billboard Hot 100 and Hot 100 Airplay chart. It was the number one song in the United States the day of the September 11 attacks. Rooney recalled: "I didn't get a chance to celebrate the success of "I'm Real" so much because of all that was going on. The focus shifted. I remember it putting a really dark cloud over everything." "I'm Real" spent the next three charting weeks at the summit and was subsequently knocked out of the top spot by "Fallin'", which boasted an additional three consecutive weeks at number one. After three weeks stalled at number two, "I'm Real" returned to number one again for a final two weeks, through October 27, 2001.

==== Billboard controversy ====
The success of "I'm Real (Murder Remix)", which became the biggest hit of Lopez's career at the time, propelled the album J.Lo from number 90 on the Billboard 200 back to the top ten according to Nielsen SoundScan. The chart position of the Murder Remix was boosted by radio play of the album track, which led to complaints of unfairness and change of Billboard policy in 2002. Afterwards, airplay of identically named songs but with substantially different melodies was not combined when computing chart positions. Rooney stated that the song's success "really pissed off everybody in terms of Billboard's rules". Following the release of "Ain't It Funny (Murder Remix)", Chuck Taylor of Billboard noted: "Sony has got to be kidding, calling it "Ain't it Funny" when not one note of it is held in common with the original", calling it a "disturbing trend".

=== Oceania and Europe ===
Elsewhere, "I'm Real" was very successful. In Australia, the song debuted at number nine, before moving to number six. After weeks descending the charts, the song eventually climbed once again to number six, remaining at number seven for two further weeks. Finally, the song climbed to number five, on January 6, 2002, before peaking at number three the following week. It was Lopez's highest charting-single since her debut-single "If You Had My Love" (1999). In New Zealand, "I'm Real" debuted at number 44, before peaking at number three for two consecutive weeks, becoming her highest single from J.Lo since "Love Don't Cost a Thing" and the album's third top-ten single.

In Europe, the song continued the success. In the United Kingdom, "I'm Real" became Lopez's sixth top-five single, reaching number four, also becoming her fourth consecutive top-five single from the same album. In France, "I'm Real" debuted at number 90, on December 15, 2001. The song kept climbing, until it reached a peak of number three, on January 12, 2002. It became her highest charting-single in France, until "Get Right" peaked at number two in 2005 and was certified gold by SNEP for over 250,000 sold. It was the fourth time the artist achieved this in the country.

== Music video ==
The music video for "I'm Real" was directed by Dave Meyers and followed its release as a single in the United States. The original version's music video depicts Lopez driving a motorcycle in the countryside, with Meyers noting that it "looked very country". Lopez's soon-to-be husband Cris Judd appeared as a dancer in the clip; the video also featured cameo appearances by Ja Rule, Irv Gotti and underwear model Travis Fimmel. According to Meyers, "we finished that video very quickly, turned it around and then shot the remix video." The director said: "We got Ja out there and then Irv shakes his head and goes, 'Nah, this is all wrong.' He's like, 'Dave, check it out: We just remixed the song. This is hot. We need to bring Jennifer and Ja to the hood, not out in the wilderness, not in the reeds.' So It was a one-day shoot. Then, of course, the remix video was the one that exploded."

The music video for "I'm Real" begins with Lopez driving down a highway on a motorcycle, passing various smiling children, who stop what they are doing and run after her. Lopez is also seen at a gas station, where she stops and proceeds to walk into the town. Several more people gaze at her as she walks through the town, and she is later seen eating ice cream with children, until she gets back onto her motorcycle and drives back down the highway. A string of children are running after her, and the music stops as she steps up onto a stage set on a hillside; where she goes into a dance-break to "More Bounce to the Ounce" by Zapp. These scenes feature Lopez's second husband, Cris Judd, as a back-up dancer. For the rest of the video, Lopez continues to sing, dance and entertain the crowd on stage as the crowd watch in pleasure. The video also features cameo appearances by Ja Rule and Travis Fimmel.

== Live performances ==
"I'm Real" was included on the set list for her series of Let's Get Loud concerts in 2001, and later appeared on the Let's Get Loud concert DVD. She sang the song on NBC's Today in the middle of the Rockefeller Plaza. The song was featured as a sample in Lopez's setlist during the Super Bowl LIV halftime show.

== Controversies ==
Alongside the controversy regarding the song's chart performance, the song was subject to a number of other controversies. There was controversy over the use of the single's sample and the structure of the song. The original song contains a sample from Yellow Magic Orchestra's 1978 hit "Firecracker" (an electronic synthpop cover of Martin Denny's 1959 melody of the same name). The "Firecracker" sample was originally planned and licensed to be used for Mariah Carey's "Loverboy" from her soundtrack album Glitter. According to the music publisher of "Firecracker", Carey's team called to license a sample of the song, which had never been sampled, months before Lopez's team called to do the same. Carey felt that former husband and music executive at Sony Music (Columbia Records), Tommy Mottola, was interfering with her career by arranging for the sample to go to Lopez. Upset by the conduct of Lopez and her ex-husband which caused her to change the sample in "Loverboy" to "Candy" by Cameo, Carey featured a reference to the song on the remix of her single "Loverboy", her first single released by her record company at the time, Virgin Records. The verse can be heard in Da Brat's rap section, where she sings, "Hate on me much as you want to / You can't do what the fuck I do / Bitches be emulating me daily" over the melody of "Firecracker". In 2020, Carey released the original version of "Loverboy", with the "Firecracker" sample on her compilation album The Rarities, released on October 2, 2020.

== Track listings ==
- Australian CD1
1. "I'm Real" (Murder Remix featuring Ja Rule)
2. "I'm Real" (radio edit)
3. "I'm Real" (Dezrok club mix)
4. "I'm Real" (Dreem Teem Master)
5. "I'm Real" (Pablo Flores club mix)
6. "I'm Real" (Andre Betts remix)
- Australian CD2
1. "I'm Real" (Murder Remix featuring Ja Rule)
2. "I'm Real" (radio edit)
3. "I'm Real" (Dezrock vocal radio edit)
4. "I'm Real" (Dreem Teem UK Garage mix)
5. "I'm Real" (D. MD Strong club)
6. "I'm Real" (Pablo Flores Euro dub)
- European CD single
1. "I'm Real" (Murder Remix featuring Ja Rule—clean version) – 4:22
2. "I'm Real" (album version) – 4:55
- European maxi-CD single
1. "I'm Real" (Murder Remix featuring Ja Rule) – 4:22
2. "I'm Real" (album version) – 4:55
3. "I'm Real" (Warren Clarke's club mix)
4. "I'm Real" (Dreem Team Master)
5. "I'm Real" (D. MD Strong club)
- European 12-inch single

A1. "I'm Real" (Murder Remix featuring Ja Rule)
A2. "I'm Real" (album version)
B1. "I'm Real" (Warren Clarke's club mix)
B2. "I'm Real" (D. MD Strong club)

- UK CD1
1. "I'm Real" (radio edit) – 3:15
2. "I'm Real" (Warren Clarke's club mix) – 7:00
3. "Let's Get Loud" – 3:58
4. "I'm Real" (video)
- UK CD2
1. "I'm Real" (Murder Remix featuring Ja Rule) – 4:22
2. "I'm Real" (Andre Betts remix) – 3:56
3. "I'm Real" (Dezrok radio remix) – 3:38
4. "I'm Real" (Dreem Teem remix) – 4:06
5. "I'm Real" (Murder Remix featuring Ja Rule; video)
- UK 12-inch single

A1. "I'm Real" (Murder Remix featuring Ja Rule) – 4:22
A2. "I'm Real" (Andre Betts remix) –3:56
A3. "I'm Real" (Dreem Teem remix) – 4:06
B1. "I'm Real" (Warren Clarke's club mix) – 7:00
B2. "I'm Real" (Warren Clarke's instrumental dub) – 7:28
B3. "I'm Real" (original mix) – 4:55

- UK cassette single
1. "I'm Real" (radio edit) – 3:15
2. "I'm Real" (Murder Remix featuring Ja Rule) – 4:22
3. "Let's Get Loud" – 3:58
- US 7-inch single

A. "I'm Real" (Murder Remix featuring Ja Rule—clean version) – 4:22
B. "Love Don't Cost a Thing" – 3:50

- US 12-inch single

A1. "I'm Real" (Murder Remix featuring Ja Rule) – 4:22
A2. "I'm Real" (Dezrok club mix) – 9:23
B1. "I'm Real" (Andre Betts remix) – 3:37
B2. "I'm Real" (Pablo Flores club mix) – 9:33

== Personnel ==
Personnel are adapted from the liner notes of J.Lo.

- Leshan David Lewis – production, composition
- Ted Jensen – master engineering
- Peter Wade Keusch – Pro Tools
- Tony Maserati – mixing
- Troy Oliver – composition, production, programming, instruments
- Cory Rooney – composition, production
- David Swope – engineering assistance
- Shalene Thomas – background vocals
- Robert Williams – engineering

== Charts ==
=== Weekly charts ===
Weekly chart performance for "I'm Real"
Chart (2001)	Peak position
Australia (ARIA)	3
Australian Urban (ARIA)	1
Austria (Ö3 Austria Top 40)	25
Belgium (Ultratop 50 Flanders)	8
Belgium (Ultratop 50 Wallonia)	5
Canada (Nielsen SoundScan)	6
Canada CHR (Nielsen BDS)	2
Denmark (Tracklisten)	8
Europe (Eurochart Hot 100)	3
Finland (Suomen virallinen lista)	16
France (SNEP)	3
Germany (GfK)	11
Ireland (IRMA)	13
Italy (FIMI)	16
Netherlands (Dutch Top 40)	3
Netherlands (Single Top 100)	2
New Zealand (Recorded Music NZ)	3
Norway (VG-lista)	4
Poland (Polish Airplay Charts)	27
Romania (Romanian Top 100)	20
Scottish Singles Sales (Official Charts)	7
Sweden (Sverigetopplistan)	8
Switzerland (Schweizer Hitparade)	6
UK Singles (Official Charts)	4
UK Hip Hop/R&B (Official Charts)	3
US Billboard Hot 100	1
US Dance Singles Sales (Billboard)	6
US Hot R&B/Hip-Hop Songs (Billboard)	2
US Pop Airplay (Billboard)	1
US Rhythmic Airplay (Billboard)	1

=== Year-end charts ===
2001 year-end chart performance for "I'm Real"
Chart (2001)	Position
Australia (ARIA)	53
Belgium (Ultratop 50 Flanders)	82
Belgium (Ultratop 50 Wallonia)	62
Brazil (Crowley)	42
Canada (Nielsen SoundScan) Sony Release	103
Canada (Nielsen SoundScan) RCKT release	186
Canada Radio (Nielsen BDS)	54
Netherlands (Dutch Top 40)	68
Netherlands (Single Top 100)	29
Sweden (Hitlistan)	75
Switzerland (Schweizer Hitparade)	57
UK Singles (OCC)	73
UK Urban (Music Week)	27
US Billboard Hot 100	5
US Hot R&B/Hip-Hop Singles & Tracks (Billboard)	19
US Mainstream Top 40 (Billboard)	15
US Rhythmic Top 40 (Billboard)	6

2002 year-end chart performance for "I'm Real"
Chart (2002)	Position
Australia (ARIA)	76
Australian Urban (ARIA)	14
Canada (Nielsen SoundScan)	199
Europe (Eurochart Hot 100)	34
France (SNEP)	44
Switzerland (Schweizer Hitparade)	53
US Mainstream Top 40 (Billboard)	63
US Rhythmic Top 40 (Billboard)	87

=== Decade-end charts ===
Decade-end chart performance for "I'm Real"
Chart (2000–2009)	Position
Netherlands (Single Top 100)	80
US Billboard Hot 100	30

=== All-time charts ===
All-time chart performance for "I'm Real"
Chart (1958–2018)	Position
US Billboard Hot 100	176

== Certifications ==
Certifications for "I'm Real"
Region	Certification	Certified units/sales
Australia (ARIA)	3× Platinum	210,000^{‡}
Belgium (BRMA)	Gold	25,000^{*}
France (SNEP)	Gold	250,000^{*}
New Zealand (RMNZ) Murder remix	Platinum	30,000^{‡}
United Kingdom (BPI)	Gold	400,000^{‡}
^{*} Sales figures based on certification alone.^{‡} Sales+streaming figures based on certification alone.

== Release history ==
Release history and formats for "I'm Real"
Region	Date	Format	Version	Label	Ref.
United States	June 19, 2001	Rhythmic contemporary radio	Original	Epic	
United States	June 26, 2001	Contemporary hit radio	Original	Epic	
United States	September 4, 2001	12-inch vinyl	Various	Epic	
Australia	October 22, 2001	CD	Solo	Epic	
New Zealand	October 22, 2001	CD	Murder Remix	Epic	
Germany	October 29, 2001	CD	Various	Epic	
United Kingdom	October 29, 2001	CD; cassette	Various	Epic	
United Kingdom	November 5, 2001	12-inch vinyl	Murder Remix	Epic	
