= Ain't It Funny =

2001 single by Jennifer Lopez

Single by Jennifer Lopez

from the album J.Lo
- B-side: "Pleasure Is Mine"
- Released: June 10, 2001
- Studio: Sony Music (New York City); Criteria (Miami, Florida)
- Genre: Latin pop; disco-salsa
- Length: 4:06
- Label: Epic
- Songwriters: Jennifer Lopez; Cory Rooney
- Producers: Cory Rooney; Dan Shea

Jennifer Lopez singles chronology
"I'm Real" (2001)	"Ain't It Funny" (2001)	"I'm Real (Murder Remix)" (2001)

Music video
- "Ain't It Funny" on YouTube

"Ain't It Funny" is a song by American singer Jennifer Lopez. It was written by Lopez and Cory Rooney for the Adam Shankman-directed romantic comedy The Wedding Planner (2001). Shankman, however, felt that the song had too much of a Latin-influence to be featured in the film, and it was instead included on Lopez's second studio album, J.Lo (2001). First released in Japan in June 2001, "Ain't It Funny" was issued as the fourth and final single from the album in the United States on December 4, 2001, by Epic Records.

The song was used as background music in three television advertisements in Japan to promote the 2001 Subaru Legacy for a special campaign which was known as Three Keys Legacy. Lopez herself was also featured in all three ads. The song shares the same title with Lopez's 2002 song "Ain't It Funny (Murder Remix)", which is a completely different song.

== Writing and production ==
While watching a rough cut of The Wedding Planner (2001) in Canada, Jennifer Lopez and Cory Rooney brainstormed ideas for its accompanying soundtrack. The two "pulled different thoughts and feelings" from the film's scenes. The scene where Lopez's character Mary Fiore is in the backseat of a car listening to Matthew McConaughey and Bridgette Wilson's characters Steve Edison and Fran Donolly talk about their wedding made Rooney think of the line "ain't it funny how some feelings you just can't deny and you can't move on even though you try". According to Rooney, "all those words and melodies just started coming" to him while watching the scene. After he conceived the idea for "Ain't It Funny", Rooney returned to his home and "roughed out the track" and composed the song's chorus. He then worked with Lopez for an hour to complete the song. Tommy Mottola was so enthusiastic about the song that he contributed to its melody. Adam Shankman, however, felt that "Ain't It Funny" had too much of a Latin influence for the film, due to its usage of timbales. Lopez disagreed with Shankman and the two later agreed to use "Love Don't Cost a Thing" in the film.

== Composition ==
"Ain't It Funny"
23-second sample of "Ain't It Funny"

"Ain't It Funny" is a Latin pop song, with a duration of four minutes and six seconds (4:06). The song contains a Mecca disco beat and a "bullfight trumpet", as well as a "solid dancefloor thump". Lyrically, Lopez sings about "creating the perfect romance in your mind, then facing reality when Mr. Right is less than ideal".

== Critical response ==
The song received mixed to positive reviews. Josh Freedom du Lac of Wall of Sound wrote that "Ain't It Funny" steals its melody "wholesale" from Madonna's "La Isla Bonita", although it has a better rhythmic base. He concluded that it still "sort of runs in place, as though Lopez recorded it while standing on a treadmill". Sal Cinquemani of Slant Magazine responded positively to the song, calling it "terribly infectious". However he criticized the "overpowering choir of back-up vocalists" that sing the chorus. Jake Barnes of Dotmusic called the song bland, writing that Lopez should "check out" Jill Scott's 2000 song "One Is the Magic Number" for how Latin pop "should be done properly". Billboard's Chuck Taylor praised the song's production as "Grade A" and its lyrics as "smart".

== Chart performance ==
"Ain't It Funny" was a commercial success, peaking within the top ten in multiple countries. In Poland, the song peaked at No. 1 for eight weeks on the Polish Singles Chart. In the United Kingdom, the song peaked at No. 3, making it her fifth top-ten single there, gaining popularity there it is still played on many radio stations regularly. "Ain't It Funny" charted at No. 3 in several other countries including the Netherlands, Romania and Sweden. In Sweden, it exceeded sales of 10,000 copies and was certified Gold by the Swedish Recording Industry Association. In Belgium, the song peaked at No. 8 in Flanders and No. 5 in Wallonia. "Ain't It Funny" debuted and peaked at No. 25 in Australia on September 2, 2001. "Ain't It Funny" peaked at No. 9 in Norway, and Ireland for the week ending August 9, 2001. The single debuted at No. 14 in Switzerland on July 29, 2001, and peaked at No. 9 three weeks later. It had a successful chart run in Switzerland, remaining on the Swiss Singles Chart for a total of twenty-six weeks. In Spain, "Ain't It Funny" peaked at No. 10 for the week ending July 28, 2001. Additionally, it reached the top twenty in Germany, Austria, France, Denmark, Hungary and Italy.

== Live performances ==
From September 22–23, 2001, Lopez performed a set of two concerts in Puerto Rico, entitled Let's Get Loud. These served as the first concerts of her career, in which she was "flanked by a 10-piece orchestra, a five-person choir and 11 dancers." "Ain't It Funny", among other songs, was included on the concerts' set list. In December 2001, Lopez, Kid Rock and Ja Rule headlined a concert for the USO troops in a German military base. Lopez opened her set with "Ain't It Funny". After emerging from a center-stage trapdoor, she performed the song while backed by a line of male dancers "outfitted in military garb". On January 1, 2002, the concert aired as a special on the MTV Network hosted by Carson Daly, For the Troops: An MTV/USO Special. Joe D'Angelo of MTV News noted that she wore "a series of skimpy outfits despite chilly temperatures."

== Music video ==
The music video was filmed in sepia tone and directed by Herb Ritts. It opens with Lopez traveling on a road where she finds a fortune-teller who shows Lopez her future with the cards. A group of female gypsies (one of them played by The Pussycat Dolls member Carmit Bachar) show up and make over Lopez so as to make her one of their own. Then Lopez finds a man (played by Mexican soap opera actor Eduardo Verástegui) she could not resist, falling in love with him. In the middle of the video, there is an extended dance sequence, in which she performs a flamenco-influenced routine. Eventually all the people there start dancing together, including Lopez and her lover. The video debuted the week of July 2, 2001, internationally and in late 2001 in the US.

== Track listings ==
=== "Ain't It Funny" ===
- Australian CD single
1. "Ain't It Funny" – 4:05
2. "Ain't It Funny" (Silk's house mix 7-inch) – 3:59
3. "Ain't It Funny" (Brandnew radio mix) – 3:45
4. "Ain't It Funny" (Silk's house mix pt. 1 & 2) – 8:28
5. "Play" (Gene Lefosse remix) – 7:16
- European CD single
1. "Ain't It Funny" (album version) – 4:05
2. "Ain't It Funny" (Brandnew radio mix) – 3:45
- European maxi-CD single
1. "Ain't It Funny" (album version) – 4:05
2. "Ain't It Funny" (Silk's house mix pt. 1 & 2) – 8:28
3. "Ain't It Funny" (Brandnew extended) – 4:54
4. "Ain't It Funny" (Tropical dance remix) – 3:49
5. "Ain't It Funny" (D'Hip mix) – 4:20
- European 12-inch single

A1. "Ain't It Funny" (Silk's house mix pt. 1 & 2) – 8:28
A2. "Ain't It Funny" (album version) – 4:05
B1. "Ain't It Funny" (Brandnew extended) – 4:54
B2. "Play" (Rui da Silva mix) – 7:19

- UK CD single
1. "Ain't It Funny" – 4:05
2. "Ain't It Funny" (Silk's house mix pt. 1 & 2) – 8:28
3. "Ain't It Funny" (Almighty mix) – 7:22
4. "Ain't It Funny" (video)
- UK 12-inch single

A1. "Ain't It Funny" (Silk's house mix pt. 1 & 2) – 8:28
B1. "Ain't It Funny" (original mix) – 4:05
B2. "Play" (Rui da Silva mix) – 7:19

- UK cassette single
1. "Ain't It Funny" – 4:05
2. "Ain't It Funny" (Silk's house mix 7-inch) – 3:59
3. "Ain't It Funny" (Brandnew radio mix) – 3:45
- Japanese CD single
1. "Ain't It Funny" – 4:08
2. "Qué Ironía (Ain't It Funny)" – 4:08
3. "Pleasure Is Mine" – 4:18

=== "Qué Ironía (Ain't It Funny)" ===
- Spanish maxi-CD single (Remixes)
1. "Qué Ironía (Ain't It Funny)" (Tropical dance remix) – 3:47
2. "Qué Ironía (Ain't It Funny)" (Radio Traffic mix) – 3:12
3. "Qué Ironía (Ain't It Funny)" (Tribal mix) – 6:02
4. "Qué Ironía (Ain't It Funny)" – 4:07
5. "Ain't It Funny" (Silk's house mix 7-inch) – 3:59
6. "Ain't It Funny" (Brandnew radio mix) – 3:45

== Charts ==
=== Weekly charts ===
2001 weekly chart performance for "Ain't It Funny"
Chart (2001)	Peak position
Australia (ARIA)	25
Austria (Ö3 Austria Top 40)	16
Belgium (Ultratop 50 Flanders)	8
Belgium (Ultratop 50 Wallonia)	5
Canada AC (Nielsen BDS)	29
Denmark (Tracklisten)	16
Europe (Eurochart Hot 100)	5
France (SNEP)	13
Germany (GfK)	13
Greece (IFPI)	5
Hungary (Mahasz)	2
Ireland (IRMA)	9
Italy (FIMI)	17
Netherlands (Dutch Top 40)	2
Netherlands (Single Top 100)	3
New Zealand (Recorded Music NZ)	31
Norway (VG-lista)	9
Poland Airplay (Music & Media)	3
Poland (Nielsen Music Control)	1
Romania (Romanian Top 100)	3
Scottish Singles Sales (Official Charts)	4
Spain (Promusicae) "Qué Ironía (Ain't It Funny)"	10
Sweden (Sverigetopplistan)	3
Switzerland (Schweizer Hitparade)	9
UK Singles (Official Charts)	3
UK Dance (Official Charts)	20
UK Hip Hop/R&B (Official Charts)	1

2015 weekly chart performance for "Ain't It Funny"
Chart (2015)	Peak position
Ukraine Airplay (TopHit)	60

2024–2025 weekly chart performance for "Ain't It Funny"
Chart (2024–2025)	Peak position
Kazakhstan Airplay (TopHit)	29

=== Monthly charts ===
2024 monthly chart performance for "Ain't It Funny"
Chart (2024)	Peak position
Kazakhstan Airplay (TopHit)	31

2025 monthly chart performance for "Ain't It Funny"
Chart (2025)	Peak position
Kazakhstan Airplay (TopHit)	43

=== Year-end charts ===
2001 year-end chart performance for "Ain't It Funny"
Chart (2001)	Position
Belgium (Ultratop 50 Flanders)	57
Belgium (Ultratop 50 Wallonia)	52
Europe (Eurochart Hot 100)	56
France (SNEP)	86
Germany (Media Control)	80
Ireland (IRMA)	93
Netherlands (Dutch Top 40)	13
Netherlands (Single Top 100)	37
Romania (Romanian Top 100)	9
Sweden (Hitlistan)	34
Switzerland (Schweizer Hitparade)	63
UK Singles (OCC)	112

2023 year-end chart performance for "Ain't It Funny"
Chart (2023)	Position
Kazakhstan Airplay (TopHit)	108

2024 year-end chart performance for "Ain't It Funny"
Chart (2024)	Position
Kazakhstan Airplay (TopHit)	24

2025 year-end chart performance for "Ain't It Funny"
Chart (2025)	Position
Kazakhstan Airplay (TopHit)	52

== Certifications ==
Certifications and sales for "Ain't It Funny"
Region	Certification	Certified units/sales
Australia (ARIA)	Platinum	70,000^{‡}
Belgium (BRMA)	Gold	25,000^{*}
New Zealand (RMNZ)	Gold	15,000^{‡}
Sweden (GLF)	Gold	15,000^{^}
United Kingdom (BPI)	Gold	400,000^{‡}
^{*} Sales figures based on certification alone.^{^} Shipments figures based on certification alone.^{‡} Sales+streaming figures based on certification alone.

== Release history ==
Release dates and formats for "Ain't It Funny"
Region	Date	Format	Label	Ref.
Japan	June 20, 2001	CD single	Sony	
Germany	July 16, 2001	CD single	Sony	
United Kingdom	August 6, 2001	CD single; 12-inch vinyl; cassette single	Sony	
Australia	August 20, 2001	CD single	Epic	
Canada	September 11, 2001	CD single	Epic	
United States	December 4, 2001	Contemporary hit radio; rhythmic contemporary radio	Epic	
United States	January 7, 2002	Contemporary hit radio	Epic	
