= Pucker Up (disambiguation) =

Pucker Up is a 1980 album by American disco act Lipps, Inc.

Pucker Up may also refer to:

- Pucker Up (horse) (born 1953), an American Champion Thoroughbred racing mare
  - Pucker Up Stakes, an American Thoroughbred horse race at Arlington Park race track near Chicago, Illinois
- Pucker Up, a 1993 album by rap duo Sweet 'N Lo
- Pucker Up: The Fine Art of Whistling, a documentary film
