= I Sings =

2000 single by Mary Mary

Single by Mary Mary featuring BB Jay

from the album Thankful
- Released: August 8, 2000
- Length: 4:39
- Label: Columbia
- Songwriters: Erica Atkins; Tina Atkins; Warryn Campbell; Jarvis E. "B.B. Jay" Cooper
- Producers: Warryn Campbell; Rodney Jerkins; Don West

Mary Mary singles chronology
"Shackles (Praise You)" (2000)	"I Sings" (2000)	"Can't Give Up Now" (2001)

BB Jay singles chronology
"Don't Be Mad (Who Da Blame)" (2000)	"I Sings" (2001)

"I Sings" is a song by American gospel duo Mary Mary, released as their second single in August 2000. Gospel rapper BB Jay performs a rap on this song. This single promoted Mary Mary's debut album, Thankful.

== Music video ==
Mary Mary also shot a music video for "I Sings". The entire music video takes place inside a night club in which Mary Mary sing. Gospel rapper BB Jay takes the third verse while he dances at the club. Brandy and Sisqo also make a cameo during the video.

== Track listing ==
1. Radio edit (without rap)
2. Darkchild remix (no rap)
3. "Shackles" (Don West remix featuring Mila Don)
4. Focus remix

== Charts ==
Chart (2000–2001)	Peak position
Australia (ARIA)	88
Australian Urban (ARIA)	15
Belgium (Ultratip Bubbling Under Flanders)	17
Belgium (Ultratip Bubbling Under Wallonia)	10
Ireland (IRMA)	40
Netherlands (Dutch Top 40 Tipparade)	16
Netherlands (Single Top 100)	68
Scotland Singles (OCC)	40
Switzerland (Schweizer Hitparade)	63
UK Singles (OCC)	32
UK Hip Hop/R&B (OCC)	7
US Hot R&B/Hip-Hop Songs (Billboard)	68

== Release history ==
Region	Date	Format(s)	Label(s)	Ref.
United States	August 8, 2000	Urban; urban adult contemporary radio	Columbia	
United Kingdom	November 6, 2000	CD; cassette	Columbia	
Australia	January 22, 2001	CD	Columbia	
