= Thankful (Mary Mary album) =

Studio album by Mary Mary
- Released: May 2, 2000
- Recorded: 1999–2000
- Genre: Gospel; R&B
- Length: 53:54
- Label: Columbia
- Producer: Warryn Campbell; Rick Cousins; Al West; Andrew Gouché

Mary Mary chronology
Thankful (2000)	Incredible (2002)

Singles from Thankful
- 1. "Shackles (Praise You)" Released: February 29, 2000; 2. "I Sings" Released: August 8, 2000

Thankful is the debut studio album by American duo Mary Mary. It was released on May 2, 2000, through Columbia Records in the United States. Chiefly produced by Warryn Campbell, the album is gospel music with stylings of contemporary R&B. It produced the smash crossover hit "Shackles (Praise You)", which reached the top ten in seven countries and the single "I Sings", which was also a significant hit. Thankful established Mary Mary as one of the leading artists in contemporary Christian music, and won the duo the Grammy Award for Best Contemporary R&B Gospel Album at the 43rd awards ceremony as well as a Dove Award, a Lady of Soul Award, and a Stellar Award. It is one of the best-selling gospel albums of all time.

== Critical reception ==
Professional ratings
Review scores
Source	Rating
AllMusic	4.5/5 stars
Cross Rhythms	10/10 stars

The album received generally favorable reviews from music critics. William Ruhlmann from AllMusic gave Thankful a grade of four and a half out of five stars. He wrote that "Thankful is pure gospel music, a series of praise songs and cautionary tales with religious messages, but it is likely to have a broader appeal than most gospel music." Cross Rhythms felt that Mary Mary "look set for big things both on the secular and gospel market. That's because they have very attractive vocals and the use the very same musical styles and beats currently popular within secular R&B. But somehow, even though their lyrical content is very much gospel-based, they've managed to appeal equally to the secular market."

== Chart performance ==
Thankful peaked at number one on the US Top Gospel Albums, number twenty-two on the US Billboard Top R&B/Hip-Hop Albums and number fifty-nine on the US Billboard 200. It was certified double platinum by the Recording Industry Association of America (RIAA) for selling over 2 million copies in the United States.

== Track listing ==
No.	Title	Writer(s)	Producer(s)	Length
1.	"Thankful"	Erica Atkins; Tina Atkins; Warryn Campbell	Campbell	3:23
2.	"I Sings" (featuring BB Jay)	E. Atkins; T. Atkins; Campbell; Jarvis E. "B.B. Jay" Cooper	Campbell	4:39
3.	"What a Friend"	E. Atkins; T. Atkins; Campbell	Campbell	3:11
4.	"Shackles (Praise You)"	E. Atkins; T. Atkins; Campbell; Franne Golde; Dennis Lambert; Duane Hitchings	Campbell	3:16
5.	"Can't Give Up Now"	E. Atkins; T. Atkins; Campbell; Curtis Burrell	Campbell; Dr. Jonathan Greer II	4:57
6.	"Be Happy"	E. Atkins; T. Atkins; Al West; Nycolia "Tye-V" Turman	West; Turman	4:34
7.	"Joy"	E. Atkins; T. Atkins; Campbell; Tamara Savage; John "Jubu" Smith	Campbell	4:10
8.	"I Got It"	E. Atkins; T. Atkins; Campbell	Campbell	3:49
9.	"Somebody"	E. Atkins; T. Atkins; Campbell; Smith	Campbell	3:34
10.	"Good to Me" (featuring Destiny's Child)	E. Atkins; T. Atkins; Campbell; Curtis Mayfield	Campbell	4:09
11.	"One Minute"	E. Atkins; T. Atkins; Campbell; Turman; Rick Cousins; Latrelle Simmons	Campbell; Rick "Dutch" Cousin	4:47
12.	"Still My Child" (featuring Charles Veal Jr. & South Central Chamber Orchestra)	E. Atkins; T. Atkins; Campbell	Campbell	3:57
13.	"Still My Child (Interlude)"	E. Atkins; T. Atkins; Campbell	Campbell	0:49
14.	"Wade in the Water"	Andrew Gouché	Gouché; Campbell	4:29
Total length:				53:54

Samples

- "Shackles (Praise You)" contains a replayed bass sample from "Don't Look Any Further", performed by Dennis Edwards & Siedah Garrett.
- "Can't Give Up Now" contains a replayed sample from "I Don't Feel No Ways Tired", performed by Rev. James Cleveland.
- "Good to Me" contains a replayed sample from "Give Me Your Love", written & performed by Curtis Mayfield.

== Charts ==
=== Weekly charts ===
Chart (2000)	Peak position
Australian Albums (ARIA)	48
Dutch Albums (Album Top 100)	67
French Albums (SNEP)	72
Hungarian Albums (MAHASZ)	38
Norwegian Albums (VG-lista)	35
Swiss Albums (Schweizer Hitparade)	38
UK Albums (OCC)	76
UK R&B Albums (OCC)	11
US Billboard 200	59
US Christian Albums (Billboard)	1
US Top Gospel Albums (Billboard)	1
US Top R&B/Hip-Hop Albums (Billboard)	22

=== Year-end charts ===
Chart (2000)	Position
US Billboard 200	196
US Christian Albums (Billboard)	10
US Top Gospel Albums (Billboard)	2
US Top R&B/Hip-Hop Albums (Billboard)	92
Chart (2001)	Position
US Christian Albums (Billboard)	7
US Top Gospel Albums (Billboard)	3
Chart (2002)	Position
US Christian Albums (Billboard)	34
US Top Gospel Albums (Billboard)	10
Chart (2025)	Position
US Top Gospel Albums (Billboard)	38

=== Decade-end charts ===
Chart (2000–2009)	Position
US Top Gospel Albums (Billboard)	4

== Certifications ==
Region	Certification	Certified units/sales
United Kingdom (BPI)	Silver	60,000^{*}
United States (RIAA)	2× Platinum	2,000,000^{‡}
^{*} Sales figures based on certification alone.^{‡} Sales+streaming figures based on certification alone.
