= Cariño (song) =

2001 song performed by Jennifer Lopez

Promotional single by Jennifer Lopez

from the album J.Lo
- Released: 2001
- Studio: Sony Music Studios (New York City)
- Genre: Latin pop; disco-salsa
- Length: 4:15
- Label: Epic
- Songwriters: Manny Benito; Cory Rooney; Guillermo Edghill Jr.; Jose Sanchez; Frank Rodriguez; Mongo Santamaria; Neal Creque; Jennifer Lopez
- Producers: Guillermo Edghill Jr.; Jose Sanchez; Frank Rodriguez; Cory Rooney

Audio video
- "Cariño" on YouTube

"Cariño" (English: Dear) is a song recorded by American singer Jennifer Lopez for her second studio album J.Lo (2001). It was released as a promotional single from the album.

== Writing and production ==
Guillermo Edghill Jr. chose to create an interpolatation of Mongo Santamaria's "Sofrito", to whose music his father Guillermo Edghill—who had played bass on three albums of and toured live with Santamaría from the 1970s throughout the 1990s—introduced him to as a child. Edghill Jr and the other members of the production team Swing Central Station, Jose Sanchez and Frank Rodriguez, composed and arranged the original track and Sanchez then presented it to Jennifer Lopez & Tommy Mottola. Lopez & Mottola went crazy for the mambo-infused track and immediately started discussing song concepts and writing ideas.

However, it took "forever" to develop, according to Lopez, who stated: "I couldn't write it, Cory [Rooney] couldn't write it. We had other people try to write it. No one could write this damn song." Eventually, Manny Benito was brought in to contribute to the song's lyrics.

While she was in Europe promoting The Cell, Rooney called Lopez and told her he had finished writing the song, which he described as "sexy". Lopez "loved it", although slightly changed the chorus.

== Composition ==
"Cariño"
A twenty-four second sample of the chorus for "Cariño". Over a heavy amount of Latin instrumentation, Lopez declares that she needs to have her lover's affection.

"Cariño" is a heavily influenced bilingual Latin pop song which runs for a duration of four minutes and fifteen seconds (4:15). It was produced by Jose Sanchez, Guillermo Edghill Jr., Frank Rodriguez and Cory Rooney. Lopez recorded her vocals for the track with Robert Williams at the Sony Music Studios in New York City; the song was later mixed by Tony Maserati and mastered by Ted Jensen at the Sterling Sound Studios, New York City.

Lopez stated that "Cariño" is a "cha-cha-inspired" "Latin-y pop track". She explained the term "Cariño" to mean "love and affection"; speaking of the lyrics, she stated: "It's when you touch and it's very affectionate. You can also call someone cariño. It's just a term of affection".

The song is built around an interpolation of Cuban percussionist Mongo Santamaria's 1976 song "Sofrito". In the chorus for "Cariño", which includes several of Lopez's sexual "emotive cries", she tells her lover that she "gotta have" his love and needs to feel his touch, stating that she could "never get enough, cariño, cariño". Furthermore, the song contains horn and Mambo horn sections. Additionally, "Cariño" features a heavily Latin-influenced live rhythm section.

== Critical response ==
Joan Anderman of The Boston Globe described the song as "scintillating," stating: "Cariño, one of half a dozen tracks Lopez co-wrote, has real sex appeal – the pre-MTV variety that flows from a hot tangle of horns and a glistening mambo – and it infuses Lopez's singing with uncharacteristic passion". Jim Derogatis of Chicago Sun-Times praised it for showcasing Lopez's "Puerto Rican heritage", while a writer from the Contra Costa Times described the song as "Latin-flavored" and "effective." Despite this, Craig D. Lindsey writing for Houston Press, felt that Lopez "tries her best to be distinctive" when she "soothes her Latino listeners" with "Cariño." In a review of its parent album J.Lo, a writer from The Daily Nebraskan stated that "Cariño" and "Si Ya Se Acabó" showcase Lopez's "definite talent."

== Live performance ==
During her Let's Get Loud concerts which took place in San Juan, Puerto Rico at the Roberto Clemente Coliseum (which was also her first concert), Lopez performed "Cariño". The heavily salsa and Latin influenced performance began with Lopez's male dancers. Lopez, clothed in a red dress, then emerges and performs the song, which includes a dance-break.

== Credits and personnel ==
Credits adapted from the liner notes of J.Lo.

- Cory Rooney – songwriter, producer, arrangement
- Jennifer Lopez - lead vocals
- Manny Benito – songwriter
- Guillermo Edghill Jr – composer, producer
- Frank Rodriguez – composer, producer
- Neal Creque – songwriter
- Jose Sanchez – composer, producer
- Angel Fernandez – arrangement, trumpet, string guitar
- Dave Burnett – bass guitar
- Erben Perez – string bass
- Mario Gonzalez – acoustic guitar
- Dave Lavender – acoustic guitar
- Bobby Allende – percussion
- Ricky Gonzalez – piano
- Shelene Thomas – piano
- Robert Williams – vocal producer
- David Swope – assistant recording engineer
- Jim Jaisby – assistant recording engineer
- Pete Wade Keusch – Pro Tools, assistant mixing engineer
- Tony Maserati – mixing engineer
