= BB Jay =

American rapper

- Born: Jarvis Edward Cooper; Brooklyn, New York, U.S.
- Genres: East Coast hip hop, Christian hip hop
- Occupation: Rapper
- Years active: 1996–present
- Label: Jive

Jarvis Edward Cooper, often abbreviated J. E. Cooper, is an American rapper professionally known as BB Jay from Brooklyn. He is noted for his vocal similarity to The Notorious B.I.G. He often reflects his Christian views, values of his faith and belief in the divinity of Jesus.

== Early life ==
Cooper was born in Brooklyn, but was raised in New Jersey. He was first introduced to Christian hip hop at the age of 11. He went to a Christian youth camp in Lebanon, New Jersey where he met gospel rapper Rap'n Rev.

== Career ==
In 1997, Cooper released his first single independently, called "The Pentecostal Poppa". The single was successful on radio and received rotation on BET. A year after signing with Jive Records, he released his international debut album Universal Concussion in 2000. The album was heavily promoted with music videos, singles, and national touring. In 2001, he made a guest appearance on "I Sings" by American gospel duo Mary Mary for their debut studio album, Thankful (2000). After a five-year hiatus, BB Jay recorded a collaboration album with rappers Pettidee & Demetrus titled 3 The God Way, released in 2005. Unlimited was released on June 26, 2007. The 17-track album included a companion DVD also titled Unlimited.

== Awards and achievements ==
In 2002, Cooper has received a Holy Hip-Hop Award and a Stellar Award for New Artist Of The Year. In 2007, he won a Carolina Holy Hip Hop Achievement Award for National Hip Hop Apostle of the Year.

== Discography ==
- Universal Concussion (2000)
- 3 The God Way (2005, collaboration Pettidee & Demetrus)
- Unlimited (2007)
