= Let's Get Loud (concerts) =

Set of concerts by American recording artist Jennifer Lopez

- Special concert by Jennifer Lopez
- Promotional poster for the concert
- Location: San Juan, Puerto Rico
- Venue: Roberto Clemente Coliseum
- Associated album: On the 6; J.Lo
- Date: September 22–23, 2001

Jennifer Lopez concert chronology
- Let's Get Loud (2001); Jennifer Lopez & Marc Anthony en Concierto (2007)

Let's Get Loud was a limited engagement by American entertainer Jennifer Lopez, in support of her first and second studio albums On the 6 (1999) and J.Lo (2001) . The concerts took place in San Juan, Puerto Rico at the Roberto Clemente Coliseum during the Fall of 2001.

== Background ==
In May 2001, Reuters reported Lopez was to film a television concert special for NBC. After her performance at the 2001 Video Music Awards, Lopez announced she will perform two concerts in Puerto Rico. She commented on her decision to perform in Puerto Rico stating, "[…]It’s where I’m from, it’s where my roots are, it’s where my parents were born. I was born in New York, but I was raised very Puerto Rican. To be able to come here, it’s my homeland in a way. To be able to do my first show, it’s an amazing feeling."

The concerts marks Lopez's first "touring" experience since her music debut in 1999. She describes the experience as:

"You know, a couple of months ago when we first started, it was like ‘Oh, my God’. Everybody was excited, we had all these ideas. It was exciting. Then a week into it, we were like ‘what have we gotten ourselves into, this is a huge undertaking.’ And we really only had about seven weeks to put it all together, which, when you’re putting together a full length concert, you have three to four months. I do a tribute to Selena because that movie and getting to know her after the fact and to play her on screen was such a moving experience for me."

The shows were conceptualized by Lopez's former husband, Cris Judd, who also served as choreographer along with Eddie Garcia and Liz Imperio. Paul Pesco served as musical director. Tickets ranged from $45-$90; Marc Anthony was rumored to make an appearance at the concert but never did.

After the performances, Lopez said that she wanted to embark on a full tour in 2002. However, this plan did not come to fruition.

== Set list ==
1. "Let's Get Loud"
2. "Ain't It Funny"
3. "Cariño"
4. "Play"
5. "Feelin' So Good"
6. "I'm Real"
7. "Secretly" (contains elements of "Dreaming of You")
8. "Theme from Mahogany (Do You Know Where You're Going To)"
9. "I Could Fall in Love"
10. "Si Ya Se Acabó"
11. "Waiting for Tonight" (Hex's Momentous Club Mix)
12. "Una Noche Más" / "Walking on Sunshine"
13. "If You Had My Love"
14. "Love Don't Cost a Thing"
  Encore
15. "Plenarriqueña"

== Broadcasts and recordings ==
The concerts originally aired on November 20, 2001, on NBC. The concert special titled "Jennifer Lopez: In Concert" was the highest rated program for that time slot. The 80–minute concert was shortened to 44 minutes, removing all of Lopez's Spanish songs and her conversation with the audience. The special was directed by Hamish Hamilton and was nominated for an ALMA Award for "Outstanding Performance in a Music, Variety or Comedy Special".

The DVD, entitled "Let's Get Loud" was released in February 2003. The DVD featured the full concert along with a 20–minute behind–the–scenes documentary entitled "Welcome to Puerto Rico". The DVD received a gold certification from the Recording Industry Association of America
