= Sweet 'N Lo =

Former Rap Duo

- Genres: Hip hop, funk, rap
- Years active: 1993–1996
- Labels: Atlantic, Third Stone Records
- Past members: Georgette "Sweet" Franklin; Lori "Lo" Esteen (deceased)

Sweet 'N Lo was an American rap duo consisting of Georgette "Sweet" Franklin and Lori "Lo" Esteen. They found minimal success with their first and only single, "40 Dog", which was taken from their only studio album entitled, Pucker Up. "40 Dog" peaked at number 60 on Billboard U.S. R&B chart. Pucker Up was released on August 3, 1993, via Atlantic and Third Stone Records.

== Members ==
=== Lori Esteen ===
Lori "Lo" Esteen went into group management after the release of Sweet 'N Lo's debut album. On January 25, 1996, Esteen, her friend Thomas Blincoe and her friend Diana Davis were found shot to death in Jefferson Park in Los Angeles, California. She was 26 years old.

=== Georgette Franklin ===
Georgette "Sweet" Franklin was later involved in songwriting, including writing Jennifer Lopez's 2001 hit song, "Love Don't Cost a Thing".
