= Peter Pucker =

Austrian footballer

Personal information
- Date of birth: February 8, 1988 (age 38)
- Place of birth: Sankt Veit an der Glan, Austria
- Height: 1.82 m (6 ft 0 in)
- Position: Defensive midfielder

Team information
- Current team: Austria Klagenfurt
- Number: 8

Senior career*
Years	Team	Apps	(Gls)
2007–2010	SK Austria Kärnten	15	(0)
2010–	Austria Klagenfurt	73	(1)
- * Club domestic league appearances and goals as of 2 October 2012

Peter Pucker (born February 8, 1988, in Sankt Veit an der Glan, Carinthia) is an Austrian football player who currently plays for Austria Klagenfurt.

Before joining SK Austria Kärnten he played youth soccer for SK Maria Saal, BNZ Kärnten and FC Kärnten.
