= Play (Jennifer Lopez song) =

2001 single by Jennifer Lopez

Single by Jennifer Lopez

from the album J.Lo
- Released: March 20, 2001
- Recorded: 2000
- Studio: Murlyn (Stockholm, Sweden); Sony Music (New York City)
- Genre: Dance-pop; electropop
- Length: 3:33 (album version); 3:18 (radio edit)
- Label: Epic
- Songwriters: Anders Bagge; Arnthor Birgisson; Christina Milian; Cory Rooney
- Producers: Bag & Arnthor

Jennifer Lopez singles chronology
"Love Don't Cost a Thing" (2000)	"Play" (2001)	"I'm Real" (2001)

Music video
- "Play" on YouTube

"Play" is a song recorded by American singer Jennifer Lopez for her second studio album, J.Lo (2001). It was released on March 20, 2001, as the album's second single. The song was written by Cory Rooney, Christina Milian, Arnthor Birgisson and Anders Bagge, with production done by the latter two under their production name, Bag & Arnthor. A dance-pop track, it was noted for its funky vibe, compared to the works of Madonna by critics. Over an electric guitar and a funky beat, Lopez sings about pleading a DJ to play her favorite song.

"Play" was a commercial success, peaking at number 18 on the US Billboard Hot 100. Outside of the United States, "Play" peaked within the top 10 of the charts in over 10 countries, including Canada, Finland, Italy, and the United Kingdom. Its futuristic-themed music video was directed by Francis Lawrence. Additionally, "Play" was performed live by Lopez on numerous occasions, including at her Let's Get Loud concerts.

== Background ==
After a high-profile title role as Selena Quintanilla in the musical biopic Selena (1997), Jennifer Lopez began developing her own career in music, later being signed to Work Records by Tommy Mottola. Her debut album On the 6 (1999) became an instant commercial success, and spawned the Billboard Hot 100 number one song "If You Had My Love". This led her to begin recording new material for her second album in April 2000. Initially, the album was to be called A Passionate Journey. During this period, Lopez began to transition into a sex symbol and was nicknamed J.Lo by the public, which is known as a nickname and "public persona". Hence, she instead released an album entitled J.Lo, which she credits as being more "personal" and "romantic" than On the 6. "Love Don't Cost a Thing", the album's lead single, was globally premiered on November 16, 2000.

== Composition and critical reception ==
"Play"
A twenty-second sample of the song's bridge, in which Lopez explicitly pleads with a DJ to play her favorite song.

"Play" is a dance-pop and electropop song with a length of three minutes and thirty-three seconds (3:33). It was written by Anders Bagge, Arnthor Birgisson, Cory Rooney and Christina Milian, with production from Bagge and Birgisson (collectively credited as Bag & Arnthor). Milian performed back up vocals on the song, prior to her own debut as a recording artist. Lopez recorded the lead vocals with Robert Williams at Murlyn Studios, Stockholm, and at Sony Music Studios in New York City. It was later mastered by Ted Jensen. On the song, Lopez pleads with a nightclub DJ to "play her favorite song", containing lyrics such as, "Play, come on DJ/ Play that song/ Play it all night long/ Just turn it up and turn me on". It contains a "shuffling" electric guitar, as performed by Paul Pesco, over a "whistling electronica dance beat." A writer from Telegram & Gazette noted the track to be "Madonna-esque."

AllMusic's MacKenzie Wilson said "Play" "coincided with Lopez's funky style". Sal Cinquemani of Slant Magazine commented that "so many of the tracks" on the album "sound like they're straight out of 1986". He then went on to opine that "I'm Real" or the "funky" "Play" would have made a "brave" choice for the album's lead single, instead of "Love Don't Cost a Thing". A writer from The Indianapolis Star dismissed the album and its sexual content, while also using the explicit "Play" as an example of it not being appropriate for Lopez's target audience, who are predominantly preteens. Jake Barnes of Yahoo! Music UK noted "Play" to resemble the music of Prince.

== Chart performance ==
"Play" experienced moderate commercial success. For the week of April 7, 2001, "Play" debuted at number 76 on the Billboard Hot 100, winning the "Hot Shot Debut of the Week" title. It also made its debut at number 69 on the Billboard Hot 100 Airplay Chart. The following week, it jumped to number 46 on the Hot 100 and number 47 on the Airplay chart. For the week of April 21, "Play" jumped to number 28 to both charts. The song peaked at number 18 on the Hot 100 for the week ending May 19, failing to break into the top 10. In addition, the single peaked at number six on the Billboard Pop 100 as well as two on the Billboard Hot Dance Club Play chart. In Canada, it peaked at number five on the Canadian Singles Chart.

"Play" also achieved success outside North America. In the United Kingdom, the song debuted and peaked at number three on the UK Singles Chart on May 6, 2001 — for the week ending date May 12, 2001. It remained on the chart for a total of twelve weeks. On April 29, 2001, the song debuted at number 21 on the Australian Singles Chart on April 30, 2001 — for the week ending date May 6, 2001. It eventually peaked at number 14 on the chart five weeks later. The Australian Recording Industry Association (ARIA) certified it platinum, marking sales and streams of 70,000 units. In New Zealand, "Play" debuted at number 48 on the New Zealand Singles Chart on April 23, 2001. It became a top-ten hit there, peaking at number seven a month later. In Italy, the song debuted and peaked at number eight on the Italian Singles Chart on April 26, 2001. Elsewhere in Europe, it peaked within the top 10 in Belgium, Finland, Ireland, the Netherlands, Sweden, and Switzerland and the top 20 in Denmark, France, Germany, Norway, and Spain. It also reached top thirty in Austria.

== Promotion ==
=== Music video ===
The mainly computer generated music video for "Play" was directed by Francis Lawrence. Set in a futuristic multi-level spaceship, the clip begins with Lopez strutting into the boarding area whilst the other passengers gaze at her in awe. The video then cuts to Lopez, now on the plane, relaxing with a pair of headphones on listening to music. Various shots showing the plane's exterior are intercut with these scenes of the singer. Lopez is then seen entering a room through sliding doors with a new outfit. The doors lead to a club filled with dancers. Intercut with these scenes are Lopez dancing solo on a platform, later joined by back-up dancers. Towards the music video's conclusion, Lopez asks the DJ (who takes the avatar of an iris) to play her favorite song. Its final shot depicts the plane flying towards the horizon. The music video, much like "Love Don't Cost a Thing", also features Cris Judd as a back-up dancer, who would go on to become her second husband months later.

According to the VH1 Top 20 Video Countdown, the entire video was computer-generated (apart from the principal actors and extras), and the project spent six weeks in post-production as a result.

=== Live performances ===
On January 12, 2001, Lopez performed "Play" along with "Love Don't Cost a Thing" live during an appearance on Top of the Pops. In February 2001, Lopez appeared as a featured performer at a special Total Request Live event, CBS Sports Presents: MTV's TRL The Super Bowl Sunday, which occurred in Tampa, Florida at The NFL Experience theme park. Songs such as "Play" and "Love Don't Cost a Thing" were included on her setlist. From September 22–23, 2001, Lopez performed a set of two concerts in Puerto Rico, entitled Let's Get Loud. These served as the first concerts of her career, in which she was, "flanked by a 10-piece orchestra, a five-person choir and 11 dancers." "Play" was included on the concerts' set lists.

== Accolades ==
Teen Choice Awards
Year	Award	Nominated work	Result
2001	Best Dance Track	"Play"	Won

Billboard Latin Music Awards
Year	Award	Nominated work	Result	Ref.
2002	Latin Dance Club Play Track Of The Year	Play	Nominated	

== Track listings ==
- Australian CD1
1. "Play" (radio edit) – 3:18
2. "Play" (Full Intention mix – radio version) – 3:18
3. "Play" (Artful Dodger mix – main mix radio) – 4:35
4. "Play" (Thunderpuss club mix) – 8:20
5. "Love Don't Cost a Thing" (Main Rap 1 featuring Puffy) – 3:35
- Australian CD2 – "The Remixes"
1. "Play" (Ruidasilva mix) – 7:19
2. "Play" (Full Intention mix) – 6:26
3. "Play" (Artful Dodger mix) – 4:35
4. "Love Don't Cost a Thing" (HQ2 club mix) – 10:56
5. "Love Don't Cost a Thing" (Full Intention club mix) – 7:15
- UK CD single
1. "Play" – 3:31
2. "Play" (Full Intention mix) – 6:31
3. "Love Don't Cost a Thing" (Main Rap 1 featuring Puffy) – 3:36
4. "Play" (video)
- UK cassette single
1. "Play" – 3:31
2. "Play" (Full Intention radio mix) – 3:16
3. "Love Don't Cost a Thing" (Main Rap 1 featuring Puffy) – 3:36
- UK 12-inch single
1. "Play" (Full Intention mix) – 6:31
2. "Play" (Artful Dodger mix) – 4:35
3. "Play" (The Genie remix) – 7:16
- European CD single
1. "Play" (radio edit) – 3:18
2. "Play" (Full Intention mix – radio version) – 3:18
- European maxi-CD single
1. "Play" (radio edit) – 3:18
2. "Play" (Full Intention mix – radio version) – 3:18
3. "Play" (The Genie remix) – 7:16
4. "Play" (Artful Dodger mix – main mix radio) – 3:51
5. "Love Don't Cost a Thing" (Main Rap 1 featuring Puffy) – 3:35

== Credits and personnel ==
Credits are adapted from the liner notes of J.Lo.

- Bag & Arnthor Birgisson – production and vocal production
- Christina Milian – songwriter, backing vocals
- Jennifer Lopez – lead vocals
- Paul Pesco – guitar
- Robert Williams – vocal recording engineer
- David Swope – assistant audio engineer, mixing assistant
- Tony Maserati – mixing
- Ronald Martinez – mixing assistant

== Charts ==
=== Weekly charts ===
Weekly chart performance for "Play"
Chart (2001)	Peak position
Australia (ARIA)	14
Australian Urban (ARIA)	7
Austria (Ö3 Austria Top 40)	21
Belgium (Ultratop 50 Flanders)	10
Belgium (Ultratop 50 Wallonia)	8
Canada (Nielsen SoundScan)	5
Canada CHR (Nielsen BDS)	2
Croatia (HRT)	10
Denmark (Tracklisten)	19
Europe (Eurochart Hot 100)	6
Finland (Suomen virallinen lista)	10
France (SNEP)	20
Germany (GfK)	19
Greece (IFPI)	6
Ireland (IRMA)	10
Italy (FIMI)	8
Netherlands (Dutch Top 40)	7
Netherlands (Single Top 100)	12
New Zealand (Recorded Music NZ)	7
Norway (VG-lista)	12
Poland (Polish Airplay Charts)	2
Romania (Romanian Top 100)	3
Scottish Singles Sales (Official Charts)	3
Spain (Promusicae)	14
Sweden (Sverigetopplistan)	10
Switzerland (Schweizer Hitparade)	10
UK Singles (Official Charts)	3
UK Dance (Official Charts)	14
UK Hip Hop/R&B (Official Charts)	1
US Billboard Hot 100	18
US Dance Club Songs (Billboard)	2
US Pop Airplay (Billboard)	6
US Rhythmic Airplay (Billboard)	14

=== Year-end charts ===
Year-end chart performance for "Play"
Chart (2001)	Position
Australia (ARIA)	73
Belgium (Ultratop 50 Flanders)	72
Belgium (Ultratop 50 Wallonia)	72
Canada (Nielsen SoundScan)	59
Canada Radio (Nielsen BDS)	56
Europe (Eurochart Hot 100)	86
Ireland (IRMA)	98
Netherlands (Dutch Top 40)	46
Romania (Romanian Top 100)	47
Sweden (Hitlistan)	99
Switzerland (Schweizer Hitparade)	75
UK Singles (OCC)	88
US Billboard Hot 100	72
US Dance Club Play (Billboard)	20
US Mainstream Top 40 (Billboard)	33
US Rhythmic Top 40 (Billboard)	70

== Certifications ==
Certifications and sales for "Play"
Region	Certification	Certified units/sales
Australia (ARIA)	Platinum	70,000^{‡}
Belgium (BRMA)	Gold	25,000^{*}
United Kingdom (BPI)	Silver	214,000
^{*} Sales figures based on certification alone.^{‡} Sales+streaming figures based on certification alone.

== Release history ==
Release dates and formats for "Play"
Region	Date	Format(s)	Label	Ref.
United States	March 20, 2001	Contemporary hit; rhythmic contemporary; urban radio	Epic	
Australia	April 16, 2001	CD single	Epic	
Germany	April 16, 2001	CD single	Epic	
Italy	April 23, 2001	CD single	Epic	
United Kingdom	April 30, 2001	12-inch single; CD single; cassette single	Epic	
Australia	June 11, 2001	CD single (Remixes)	Epic	

== Baby V.O.X. version ==
"Play Remix"

Single by Baby V.O.X. featuring Jennifer Lopez

from the album Ride West
- Released: April 17, 2004
- Genre: K-pop; dance-pop; electropop
- Length: 3:29
- Label: DR; EMI
- Composers: One God; Kim Shin-il
- Lyricists: Anders Bagge; Arnthor Birgisson; Christina Milian; Cory Rooney

Baby V.O.X singles chronology
"Xcstasy" (2004)	"Play Remix" (2004)

Music video
- "Play Remix" on YouTube

In 2004, South Korean girl group Baby V.O.X. covered "Play" in Korean and English for their final album, Ride West, with participation from Lopez.

=== Music video ===
The music video was shot in early 2004.

=== Live performances ===
Starting in June, they promoted their follow-up song, "Play Remix" featuring Jennifer Lopez, and were scheduled to hold a solo concert titled "Red Saturday" at the Yeomju Gymnasium in Gwangju in July. The concert was supposed to feature songs from their seventh album, but it was canceled due to legal disputes with Lee Ha-neul and damage to their image.

=== Track listings ===
- South Korean CD single
1. "Play Remix" (English version) – 3:29
2. "Play Remix" (Korean version) – 3:29
3. "Play Remix" (extended version) – 3:58
- South Korean cassette single
1. "Play Remix" (English version) – 3:29
2. "Play Remix" (Korean version) – 3:29
3. "Play Remix" (extended version) – 3:58
- US CD single
1. "Play Remix" (English version) – 3:29
2. "Play Remix" (Korean version) – 3:29
3. "Play Remix" (extended version) – 3:58
- US cassette single
1. "Play Remix" (English version) – 3:29
2. "Play Remix" (Korean version) – 3:29
3. "Play Remix" (extended version) – 3:58

=== Release history ===
Region	Release date	Edition	Format	Distributor
South Korea	April 17, 2004	Original edition	CD	DR Music; EMI
United States	April 17, 2004	US edition	CD	DR Music; EMI
