= Love Don't Cost a Thing (song) =

2000 single by Jennifer Lopez

Single by Jennifer Lopez

from the album J.Lo
- B-side: "Amor se paga con amor"; "On the 6 Megamix"
- Released: November 13, 2000
- Recorded: August 2000
- Studio: Cove City Sound (Glen Cove, New York)
- Genre: Pop; R&B
- Length: 3:42
- Label: Epic
- Songwriters: Damon Sharpe; Greg Lawson; Georgette Franklin; Jeremy Monroe; Amille D. Harris
- Producers: Ric Wake; Richie Jones; Cory Rooney

Jennifer Lopez singles chronology
"Let's Get Loud" (2000)	"Love Don't Cost a Thing" (2000)	"Play" (2001)

Music video
- "Love Don't Cost a Thing" on YouTube

"Love Don't Cost a Thing" is a song by American singer Jennifer Lopez for her second studio album J.Lo (2001). It was released on November 13, 2000, by Epic Records as the lead single from the album. The song was written by Damon Sharpe, Greg Lawson, Georgette Franklin, Jeremy Monroe and Amille D. Harris, and produced by Ric Wake, Richie Jones and Cory Rooney. At the time of the song's release, Lopez was transitioning into a sex symbol and in a relationship with American rapper Sean Combs. Lyrically, "Love Don't Cost a Thing" is described as an "exploration of love" in which Lopez is unhappy about her materialistic lover; provoking much media analysis as to whether or not it was an innuendo towards Combs. Ultimately, the pair's courtship ended shortly after its release.

Described as "frothy" and "catchy" by critics, it was noted for its message about love and commercial appeal to women. "Love Don't Cost a Thing" was met with worldwide commercial success and is considered "classic Lopez". It peaked within the top ten in the United States and foreign markets including Australia, France, Germany and Ireland, as well as peaking at number one in Canada, New Zealand and the United Kingdom, among other countries. "Love Don't Cost a Thing" was also a radio hit, becoming her first single to top the Billboard Hot 100 Airplay chart.

The music video for "Love Don't Cost a Thing" directed by Paul Hunter and choreographed by Darrin Dewitt Henson was met with acclaim, garnering MTV Video Music Award and ALMA Award nominations. It became one of the year's most-viewed clips, and was highly requested on the music video broadcasting series, Total Request Live. The music video subsequently became notorious after Lopez married Cris Judd, one of the back-up dancers who appeared in it. Lopez has performed "Love Don't Cost a Thing" live on numerous occasions, including the 2000 MTV Europe Music Awards and the 2001 MTV Video Music Awards in New York City.

== Background and release ==
After a high-profile title role as Selena Quintanilla in the musical biopic Selena (1997), Jennifer Lopez began developing her own career in music, later being signed to Work Records by Tommy Mottola. Her debut album entitled On the 6 (1999) became an instant commercial success, and spawned the Billboard Hot 100 number one song "If You Had My Love". This led her to begin recording new material for her second album in April 2000. Initially, the album was to be called A Passionate Journey. During this period, Lopez began to transition into a sex symbol and was nicknamed J.Lo by the public, which is known as a nickname and "public persona". Hence, she instead released an album entitled J.Lo, which she credits as being more "personal" and "romantic" than On the 6. "Love Don't Cost a Thing" was globally premiered on November 16, 2000. The single began impacting US radio from mid-December. "Love Don't Cost a Thing" was included on Lopez's greatest hits album, Dance Again... the Hits, which was released on July 24, 2012.

== Writing and production ==
In July 2000, Greg Lawson came up with an idea for a song he thought would be ideal for Lopez. He recalled: "I wrote and recorded a track which eventually turned out to be 'Love Don't Cost a Thing'. I called Damon up, and I played the track and sang the melody to him over the phone. We ended up collaborating on the song, with both of us writing parts of the melody and the lyric. I came up with the title, and he came up with the key line, 'Even if you were broke,' in the chorus. Three other writers, Georgette Franklin, Jeremy Munroe and Amil Harris, also contributed parts to the song." In August, after a demo for "Love Don't Cost a Thing" had been recorded, Sharpe sent a CD of the song to Ric Wake at his studio in New York. Wake, who loved the song, played it for Lopez, who also loved it. Not soon after, the master recording of "Love Don't Cost a Thing" was cut at Sony Studios in New York City.

== Composition and lyrical interpretation ==
"Love Don't Cost a Thing"

"Love Don't Cost a Thing" is a pop and R&B song with a running time of three minutes and forty-two seconds (3:42). It was primarily produced by Ric Wake, with additional production from Cory Rooney and Richie Jones. Lopez recorded her vocals for the song with Dan Hetzel and Dave Scheyer at the Cove City Sound Studios in Glen Cove, New York, which were mixed by Jones and Hetzel. Later, the song was mastered by Ted Jensen at Sterling Sound in New York. According to MTV News, "Love Don't Cost a Thing" carries on Lopez' exploration of love in her music from her first single, "If You Had My Love". Additionally, the track details the "inner workings of love". Lyrically, it is the "tale of a materialistic relationship" which is full of "credit cards and lavish gifts"; Lopez sings in the chorus: "Think you gonna keep me iced, you don't/ Think I'm gonna spend your cash, I won't/ Even if you were broke/ My love don't cost a thing." She also states that she is "not impressed" by her lover's Mercedes-Benz because "she's got her own".

It has been reported by multiple sources that the lyrical message of "Love Don't Cost a Thing" was based around her two-year relationship with rapper Sean Combs, who allegedly "showered" her with expensive jewelry. Shortly after the month's release, they broke up. During their courtship, they were considered "hip-hop's most prominent couple". Cheryl Lu-Lien Tan of The Baltimore Sun speculated that materialism was the reason for their break-up, using Combs' signature hit "It's All About the Benjamins" vs. "Love Don't Cost a Thing" as an example.

== Critical reception ==
Entertainment Weekly's Marc Weingarten noted the song to be a "standard fare, booty thump funk, with a snapping snare and a female chorus of yes gals" but praised its "bold message", "'Love Don't Cost a Thing,' is a sharp rebuke to all of those male hip hoppers who kvetch about their women going for the bling bling". Slant Magazine's Sal Cinquemani called the song a "cheap carbon copy" of producer Rodney Jerkins' "style of frothy R&B." In a review of its parent album, a reviewer from the Toronto Star said Lopez is best on "fun" "r 'n' b-ish, uptempo tracks" such as "Love Don't Cost a Thing" where "the catchy hooks and thumping bass do most of the work."

A writer from the website Crosswalk noted it to be a "fun dance song" and said, "This song, with its addictive beat and familiar vocal riffs, has a bunch of young girls singing 'even if you were broke, my love don't cost a thing.'" Stephen Thomas Erlewine of AllMusic called it "ingratiating", while Bill Lamb of About.com called it a "frothy pop confection" which he felt was "strongly influenced by the hits of Destiny's Child".

== Chart performance ==
"Love Don't Cost a Thing" experienced commercial success worldwide, and is considered one of Lopez' biggest hits; it was especially noted for its popularity on pop radio. For the week ending December 9, 2000, "Love Don't Cost a Thing" made its debut at number 46 on the US Billboard Hot 100, winning the "Hot Shot Debut" of the week award. Its second week saw it climb eighteen positions to number 28, followed by a jump to number 22 the next week. Weeks later, "Love Don't Cost a Thing" entered the chart's top ten, significantly jumping from number ten to four during the week ending January 27, 2001, as well as rising to number three on the US Billboard Hot 100 Airplay chart. Though the song began to fall on the Hot 100, it managed to peak at number one on the US Billboard Mainstream Top 40 Pop Songs chart. However, by the week ending February 24, 2001, "Love Don't Cost a Thing" peaked at number three on the Hot 100 after slowly rising the week prior; it also peaked atop the Hot 100 Airplay Chart. Despite this, the song failed to reach the top of the Hot 100, and stalled at number three for a total of two weeks. Additionally, the song peaked at number nine on the Billboard Hot Dance Club Play chart.

Apart from its domestic success, "Love Don't Cost a Thing" topped numerous charts overseas, including Canada, where it became her second number one following "If You Had My Love". It debuted at number nine on the Swiss Singles Chart, and peaked at number two. It was given a Gold certification in Switzerland by the International Federation of the Phonographic Industry, representing sales of more than 20,000 units. In Finland, it debuted at number one, before slowly descending on the charts. In the United Kingdom, the song topped the UK Singles Chart, becoming her first number one there. It was later certified platinum by the British Phonographic Industry, which denotes sales and streams of 600,000 units. In Spain, "Love Don't Cost a Thing" debuted at number one on January 13, 2001. It held this position for two more weeks, and remained in the top ten for a further six weeks. In France, "Love Don't Cost a Thing" debuted in top ten at number five and stay five weeks in the top ten for fifteen weeks in total, becoming her third top ten after "If You Had My Love" and "Waiting For Tonight". The song also made its debut at number one in Italy, and spent seven weeks in the top ten of the Italian Singles Chart. It also peaked atop the Romanian and Dutch singles charts.

In Australia, "Love Don't Cost a Thing" debuted and peaked on the ARIA Singles Chart at number four on January 28, 2001. By the end of 2001, it had been certified Platinum by the Australian Recording Industry Association, which certifies shipment of over 70,000 units. On January 14, the song debuted at number 37 in New Zealand, and peaked at number one seven weeks later on March 4, 2001, where it remained for two weeks. "Love Don't Cost a Thing" placed No. 65 on About.com's "Top 100 Best Pop Songs of 2001" list. Additionally, it ranked No. 26 on Billboard's Year-End Hot 100 singles of 2001 chart.

== Music video ==
=== Development and reception ===
The music video for "Love Don't Cost a Thing" was shot from November 10–11, 2000 in Miami, Florida, with reshoots on November 20 in Malibu, California following Lopez's right ankle injury on the first day. It was directed by Paul Hunter, a frequent collaborator with Lopez, and choreographed by actor and dancer Darrin Dewitt Henson. On December 4, 2000, the making of the video was featured on MTV's Making the Video. The video is famously known for having featured Cris Judd as her back-up dancer. Months after the music video, he would go on to become Lopez's second husband. The couple were said to have gotten close to each other during the video shoot, causing media speculation following her highly publicized split from Sean Combs.

Following its release, the clip became an immediate hit on MTV's Total Request Live, which screened popular music videos; it became the most-requested music video on the series at one stage. Throughout 2001, the music video for "Love Don't Cost a Thing" became one of the most-watched clips on the music video programming channels MTV, BET and VH1. In addition to this, the music video for "Love Don't Cost a Thing" received two nominations at the 2001 MTV Video Music Awards: Best Female Video and Best Dance Video. At the 2002 ALMA Awards, the clip was nominated for the ALMA People's Choice Award for Outstanding Music Video. John Mitchell of MTV News noted that the video continued Lopez's "trend" of "flaunting her men in videos". The music video has been included on Lopez's extended play/DVD, The Reel Me (2003), as well as her greatest hits, Dance Again... the Hits (2012).

=== Synopsis ===
The music video opens with Lopez at her rich boyfriend's mansion. He calls her to inform her that he cannot make their date, but has left her another golden bracelet. Covered in jewelry, she angrily hangs up the phone and leaves. She gets in her Aston Martin convertible and begins driving down the highway. While driving, she throws a gold purse into the air. Lopez pulls over at a tropical beach and begins to strip her expensive jewelry off. She then pulls out a postcard he gave her; and the screen zooms into a dance break in which Lopez is backed by male dancers on a tropical beach. Lopez rips up the postcard and frolics on the beach. Finally, she removes her undershirt and take a dip naked.

== Live performances ==
Lopez globally premiered the song on November 16, 2000, at the 7th MTV Europe Music Awards in Stockholm, Sweden. David Basham of MTV News noted that she arrived on-stage in "fly girl fashion via a "prop" plane". On January 12, 2001, she performed the song during an appearance on Top of the Pops. That month, she also performed the song at the 2001 American Music Awards. In February 2001, Lopez performed "Love Don't Cost a Thing" along with "Play" at a special Total Request Live event, CBS Sports Presents: MTV's TRL The Super Bowl Sunday, which occurred in Tampa, Florida at The NFL Experience theme park. Months later, the song was performed at the 2001 MTV Video Music Awards on September 6. From September 22–23, 2001, Lopez performed a set of two concerts in Puerto Rico, entitled Let's Get Loud. These served as the first concerts of her career, in which she was, "flanked by a 10-piece orchestra, a five-person choir and 11 dancers." "Love Don't Cost a Thing" was included on the concerts' set list. In December 2001, Lopez, Kid Rock and Ja Rule headlined a concert for the USO troops at Ramstein Air Base in Germany. Lopez sang "Love Don't Cost a Thing", among other songs. On January 1, 2002, the concert aired as a special on the MTV Network hosted by Carson Daly, For the Troops: An MTV/USO Special. Joe D'Angelo of MTV News noted that she wore "a series of skimpy outfits despite chilly temperatures."

In February 2010, Lopez performed the song at the Sanremo Music Festival 2010 in Italy, along with multiple other hits. Soraya Roberts of the New York Daily News commented that her dance moves weren't "highly complicated" because she was restricted by a tight leather catsuit. On October 22, 2011, she performed "Love Don't Cost a Thing" during a special concert which commemorated the 15th anniversary of the Mohegan Sun Arena. The song was included on the set list for her first world tour, 2012's Dance Again World Tour. Elise Vout of the Australian MTV News gave her performance of the song a positive review, "Working her bodacious booty under the lavish firework and pyrotechnic display, she put Kim Kardashian and Nicki Minaj to shame as she performed 'Love Don’t Cost A Thing'."

Lopez performed the track along with several other hits during a July 2013 concert in Hyde Park, London. In March 2014, she sang "Love Don't Cost a Thing" during her concert at the 2014 Dubai World Cup. In June of that year, Lopez performed the song during a concert in The Bronx which marked fifteen years since the release of her first album On the 6. Three months later, performed the song again at the 2014 Singapore Grand Prix, as part of a 90-minute set. At her The Best Is Yet To Come concert which took place on New Year's Eve 2014 in Caesars Palace, Lopez included "Love Don't Cost a Thing" on her setlist. She later performed the song as part of her medley during the 2018 MTV Video Music Awards on August 20, 2018, at Radio City Music Hall in New York City.

Elements of the song were featured in Lopez's performance during the Super Bowl LIV halftime show.

== Accolades ==
Year	Awards	Category	Result	Ref.
2001	My VH1 Music Awards	Is It Hot in Here or Is It Just My Video	Nominated	
2001	MTV Video Music Awards	Best Female Video	Nominated	
2001	MTV Video Music Awards	Best Dance Video	Nominated	
2001	Teen Choice Awards	Choice Music Single	Nominated	
2002	ALMA Awards	People's Choice for Outstanding Music Video	Won	
2002	BMI Pop Music Awards	Award-Winning Song	Won	

== Track listings ==
- US maxi-CD and 12-inch single
1. "Love Don't Cost a Thing" (HQ2 club vocal mix) – 10:54
2. "Love Don't Cost a Thing" (Main Rap 1 featuring Puffy) – 3:36
3. "Love Don't Cost a Thing" (RJ Schoolyard mix featuring Fat Joe) – 4:19
4. "Love Don't Cost a Thing" (Full Intention club mix) – 7:15
5. "Let's Get Loud" (Kung Pow club mix) – 8:08
- US 7-inch single
1. "Love Don't Cost a Thing" – 3:50
2. "Love Don't Cost a Thing" – 3:50
- UK CD single
1. "Love Don't Cost a Thing" – 3:42
2. "Love Don't Cost a Thing" (Full Intention remix) – 7:15
3. "On the 6 Megamix" – 6:30
4. "Love Don't Cost a Thing" (video)
- UK 12-inch single

A1. "Love Don't Cost a Thing" (Full Intention club mix) – 7:15
B1. "Love Don't Cost a Thing" (RJ Schoolyard mix featuring Fat Joe) – 4:19
B2. "Love Don't Cost a Thing" – 3:42

- UK cassette single
1. "Love Don't Cost a Thing" – 3:50
2. "On the 6 Megamix" – 6:30
- European CD single
1. "Love Don't Cost a Thing"
2. "Love Don't Cost a Thing" (Full Intention club mix)
- European maxi-CD single ("Amor se paga con amor")
1. "Amor se paga con amor (Love Don't Cost a Thing)" (Spanish version)
2. "Amor se paga con amor (Love Don't Cost a Thing)" (Spanglish)
3. "Amor se paga con amor (Love Don't Cost a Thing)" (alternate Spanglish)
4. "Love Don't Cost a Thing" (RJ Schoolyard mix featuring Fat Joe)
5. "Love Don't Cost a Thing" (Full Intention club mix)
- French DVD single
1. "Love Don't Cost a Thing" – 5:07
- Australian and Japanese CD single
1. "Love Don't Cost a Thing"
2. "On the 6 Megamix"
3. "Love Don't Cost a Thing" (RJ Schoolyard Mix featuring Fat Joe)

== Credits and personnel ==
Credits taken from the liner notes of J.Lo.

- Damon Sharpe, Georgette Franklin, Jeremy Monroe, Amille D. Harris – songwriting
- Ric Wake – production, arrangement
- Richie Jones – additional production, arrangement, mixing engineer, programming, drums, percussion
- Cory Rooney – additional production
- Dan Heztel – mixing engineer, vocal production
- Jim Annunziato – mixing assistance
- Miklos Malek – keyboard programming
- James Houston — executive production
- Greg Lawson – songwriting, additional programming and arrangement
- Peter Wade Keusch – Pro Tools engineering
- Dave Scheuer – vocal production
- Ronald L. Martinez, David Swope – assistant vocal engineering
- Marc Russell – production assistance
- Ted Jensen – audio mastering

== Charts ==
=== Weekly charts ===
2001 weekly chart performance for "Love Don't Cost a Thing"
Chart (2000-2001)	Peak position
Australia (ARIA)	4
Australian Urban (ARIA)	2
Austria (Ö3 Austria Top 40)	11
Belgium (Ultratop 50 Flanders)	7
Belgium (Ultratop 50 Wallonia)	2
Canada (Nielsen SoundScan)	1
Canada CHR (Nielsen BDS)	1
Croatia International (HRT)	1
Denmark (Tracklisten)	4
Europe (Eurochart Hot 100)	2
Finland (Suomen virallinen lista)	1
France (SNEP)	5
Germany (GfK)	6
Greece (IFPI)	2
Hungary (MAHASZ)	2
Ireland (IRMA)	4
Italy (FIMI)	1
Netherlands (Dutch Top 40)	1
Netherlands (Single Top 100)	1
New Zealand (Recorded Music NZ)	1
Norway (VG-lista)	3
Poland (Polish Airplay Charts)	3
Romania (Romanian Top 100)	1
Scottish Singles Sales (Official Charts)	4
Spain (Promusicae)	1
Sweden (Sverigetopplistan)	3
Switzerland (Schweizer Hitparade)	2
UK Singles (Official Charts)	1
UK Dance (Official Charts)	5
UK Hip Hop/R&B (Official Charts)	1
US Billboard Hot 100	3
US Adult Pop Airplay (Billboard)	37
US Dance Club Songs (Billboard)	9
US Dance Singles Sales (Billboard) RJ Schoolyard mix	1
US Hot R&B/Hip-Hop Songs (Billboard)	40
US Pop Airplay (Billboard)	1
US Rhythmic Airplay (Billboard)	3

2012 weekly chart performance for "Love Don't Cost a Thing"
Chart (2012)	Peak position
Hungary (Single Top 40)	8

Weekly chart performance for "Amor se paga con amor"
Chart (2001)	Peak position
US Hot Latin Songs (Billboard)	21
US Latin Pop Airplay (Billboard)	8
US Tropical Airplay (Billboard)	3

=== Year-end charts ===
Year-end chart performance for "Love Don't Cost a Thing"
Chart (2001)	Position
Australia (ARIA)	61
Belgium (Ultratop 50 Flanders)	73
Belgium (Ultratop 50 Wallonia)	32
Brazil (Crowley)	25
Canada (Nielsen SoundScan)	31
Canada Radio (Nielsen BDS)	36
Europe (Eurochart Hot 100)	17
France (SNEP)	62
Germany (Media Control)	61
Ireland (IRMA)	79
Netherlands (Dutch Top 40)	28
Netherlands (Single Top 100)	43
New Zealand (RIANZ)	37
Romania (Romanian Top 100)	25
Spain (AFYVE)	9
Sweden (Hitlistan)	73
Switzerland (Schweizer Hitparade)	25
UK Singles (OCC)	56
UK Urban (Music Week)	29
US Billboard Hot 100	26
US Mainstream Top 40 (Billboard)	11
US Maxi-Singles Sales (Billboard)	13
US Rhythmic Top 40 (Billboard)	14

== Certifications ==
Certifications and sales for "Love Don't Cost a Thing"
Region	Certification	Certified units/sales
Australia (ARIA)	2× Platinum	140,000^{‡}
Belgium (BRMA)	Gold	25,000^{*}
New Zealand (RMNZ)	Gold	15,000^{‡}
Switzerland (IFPI Switzerland)	Gold	20,000^{^}
United Kingdom (BPI)	Platinum	600,000^{‡}
^{*} Sales figures based on certification alone.^{^} Shipments figures based on certification alone.^{‡} Sales+streaming figures based on certification alone.

== Release history ==
Release dates and formats for "Love Don't Cost a Thing"
Region	Date	Format(s)	Label(s)	Ref(s).
United States	November 13, 2000	Urban contemporary radio	Epic	
United States	November 21, 2000	Contemporary hit radio; rhythmic contemporary radio	Epic	
United States	December 2, 2000	7-inch vinyl	Epic	
Denmark	January 8, 2001	CD single	Epic	
Germany	January 8, 2001	CD single	Epic	
United Kingdom	January 8, 2001	12-inch vinyl; CD single; cassette single	Epic	
France	January 9, 2001	DVD single	Epic	
Japan	January 11, 2001	CD single	SME	
Italy	January 12, 2001	CD single	Epic	
Australia	January 15, 2001	CD single	Epic	
United States	February 27, 2001	12-inch vinyl; CD single	Epic	

== See also ==
- List of Romanian Top 100 number ones of the 2000s
