= Marc Anthony discography =

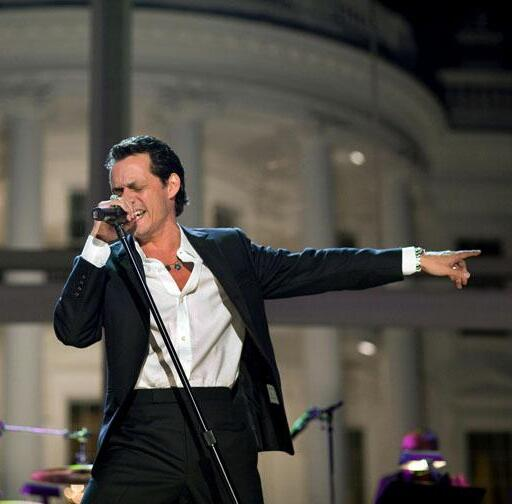
- Marc Anthony at the "In Performance at the White House: Fiesta Latina", 2009.
- Studio albums: 13
- Soundtrack albums: 1
- Live albums: 2
- Compilation albums: 4
- Singles: 49
- Music videos: 39

American singer and songwriter Marc Anthony has released 13 studio albums, 39 music videos and 49 singles. Anthony has sold more than 12 million albums worldwide.

== Albums ==
=== Studio albums ===
Year	Album	Chart positions										Certifications
Year	Album	US	CAN	AUT	GER	NL	NZ	NOR	ESP	SWE	SWI	Certifications
1991	When the Night Is Over (with Little Louie Vega)	–	–	–	–	–	–	–	–	–	–	
1993	Otra Nota	–	–	–	–	–	–	–	–	–	–	
1995	Todo a Su Tiempo	–	–	–	–	–	–	–	–	–	–	RIAA: Gold
1997	Contra la Corriente	74	–	–	–	–	–	–	–	–	–	RIAA: Gold
1999	Marc Anthony	8	8	8	22	11	5	1	41	10	9	IFPI NOR: Platinum; IFPI SWE: Gold; IFPI SWI: Gold; MC: 2× Platinum; RIAA: 3× Platinum
2001	Libre	57	–	–	–	–	–	–	66	–	–	RIAA: Gold
2002	Mended	3	1	20	26	28	44	4	13	11	13	IFPI NOR: Gold; MC: Platinum; RIAA: Gold
2004	Amar Sin Mentiras	26	–	–	–	–	–	–	1	–	37	CAPIF: Gold; AMPROFON: Platinum; PROMUSICAE: Platinum; RIAA: 2× Platinum (Latin)
2004	Valió la Pena	122	1	–	–	–	–	–	7	–	–	PROMUSICAE: Gold; RIAA: 2× Platinum (Latin)
2007	El Cantante	31	–	–	–	–	–	–	11	–	100	
2010	Iconos	11	–	–	–	–	–	–	1	–	–	AMPROFON: Platinum; RIAA: 5× Platinum (Latin)
2013	3.0	5	–	–	–	59	–	–	1	–	62	AMPROFON: 4× Platinum; PROMUSICAE: Gold; RIAA: 13× Platinum (Latin)
2019	Opus	90	–	–	–	–	–	–	5	–	87	AMPROFON: Gold; RIAA: 2× Platinum (Latin)
2022	Pa'llá Voy	–	–	–	–	–	–	–	30	–	–	RIAA: Gold (Latin)
2024	Muévense	–	–	–	–	–	–	–	46	–	–	
"—" denotes a recording that did not chart or was not released in that territory.

=== Compilation albums ===
Year	Album	Chart positions		Certifications
Year	Album	US	ESP	Certifications
1999	Desde un Principio: From the Beginning	151	–	PROMUSICAE: Gold; RIAA: Gold
2003	Éxitos Eternos	–	39	
2004	Amar Sin Mentiras – Valió la Pena – (Edición Limitada)	–	38	
2006	Sigo Siendo Yo (Grandes Exitos)	101	2	CAPIF: Gold; PROMUSICAE: Platinum
2018	Esencial	–	100	

=== Live albums ===
Year	Album
2007	Live from New York City (Import)
2007	In Concert from Colombia (Import)
2013	Sergio George Presents: Salsa Giants (Alongside various artists)

== Singles ==
=== Solo ===
Year	Title	Peak chart positions										Certifications	Album
Year	Title	US	US Latin	AUS	AUT	GER	NL	NZ	SWE	SWI	UK	Certifications	Album
1988	"Rebel" (as Marc "Marco" Anthony)	–	–	–	–	–	–	–	–	–	–		Non-album single
1991	"Ride on the Rhythm"^{[C]}	–	–	–	–	–	–	–	–	–	71		When the Night is Over
1991	"Ride on the Rhythm" [UK re-release]	–	–	–	–	–	–	–	–	–	70		When the Night is Over
1993	"Hasta Que Te Conocí"	–	13	–	–	–	–	–	–	–	–		Otra Nota
1993	"Palabras del Alma"	–	15	–	–	–	–	–	–	–	–		Otra Nota
1993	"Si Tú No Te Fueras"	–	31	–	–	–	–	–	–	–	–		Otra Nota
1994	"Vivir Lo Nuestro" (with La India)	–	10	–	35	–	–	–	–	–	–		La Combinación Perfecta
1995	"Te Conozco Bien"	–	7	–	–	–	–	–	–	–	–		Todo a Su Tiempo
1995	"Se Me Sigue Olvidando"	–	6	–	–	–	–	–	–	–	–		Todo a Su Tiempo
1995	"Nadie Como Ella"	–	13	–	–	–	–	–	–	–	–		Todo a Su Tiempo
1996	"Te Amaré"	–	9	–	–	–	–	–	–	–	–		Todo a Su Tiempo
1996	"Llegaste a Mí"	–	11	–	–	–	–	–	–	–	–		Todo a Su Tiempo
1996	"Así Como Hoy"	–	13	–	–	–	–	–	–	–	–		Voces Unidas
1996	"Hasta Ayer"	–	6	–	–	–	–	–	–	–	–		Todo a Su Tiempo
1996	"Por Amar Se Da Todo"	–	17	–	–	–	–	–	–	–	–		Todo a Su Tiempo
1997	"Vieja Mesa"^{[D]}	–	–	–	–	–	–	–	–	–	–		Todo a Su Tiempo
1997	"Y Hubo Alguien"	–	1	–	–	–	–	–	–	–	–		Contra La Corriente
1997	"Me Voy a Regalar"	–	13	–	–	–	–	–	–	–	–		Contra La Corriente
1998	"Ride on the Rhythm" (UK remix)	–	–	–	–	–	–	–	–	–	36		Non-album single
1998	"Si Te Vas"	–	8	–	–	–	–	–	–	–	–		Contra La Corriente
1998	"No Me Conoces"	–	2	–	–	–	–	–	–	–	–		Contra La Corriente
1998	"Contra la Corriente"	–	2	–	–	–	–	–	–	–	–		Contra La Corriente
1999	"No Sabes Como Duele"	–	18	–	–	–	–	–	–	–	–		Contra La Corriente
1999	"I Need to Know"/"Dímelo"	3	1	20	16	15	18	20	19	16	28	RIAA: Gold	Marc Anthony
1999	"Da la Vuelta"	–	22	–	–	–	–	–	–	–	–		Marc Anthony
2000	"You Sang to Me"	2	1	71	3	21	2	10	11	21	–		Marc Anthony
2000	"My Baby You"	70	19	–	–	–	–	–	–	–	–		Marc Anthony
2000	"When I Dream at Night"	–	–	–	–	90	61	–	–	53	–		Marc Anthony
2001	"Tragedy"/"Tragedia"	–	–	–	64	66	78	–	29	33	–		Mended / Libre
2001	"Celos"	–	6	–	–	–	–	–	–	–	–		Libre
2002	"Hasta Que Vuelvas Conmigo"	–	21	–	–	–	–	–	–	–	–		Libre
2002	"I Need You"/"Me Haces Falta"	–	–	–	–	–	–	–	22	53	–		Mended
2002	"I've Got You"/"Te Tengo Aquí"	81	–	33	46	38	44	22	30	45	–		Mended
2002	"Viviendo"	–	11	–	–	–	–	–	–	–	–		Libre
2002	"Barco a la Deriva"^{[E]}	–	–	–	–	–	–	–	–	–	–		Libre
2003	"She Mends Me"	–	–	–	–	–	100	–	–	–	–		Mended
2004	"Ahora Quien"	–	1	–	–	–	–	–	–	–	–	AMPROFON: Gold	Amar Sin Mentiras & Valió la Pena
2004	"Valió la Pena"	–	9	–	–	–	–	–	–	–	–	AMPROFON: Gold	Amar Sin Mentiras & Valió la Pena
2004	"Volando Entre Tus Brazos"^{[G]}	–	–	–	–	–	–	–	–	–	–		Amar Sin Mentiras & Valió la Pena
2004	"Tan Solo Palabras"	–	–	–	–	–	–	–	–	–	–		Amar Sin Mentiras
2004	"Amigo"^{[F]}	–	–	–	–	–	–	–	–	–	–		Amar Sin Mentiras & Valió la Pena
2004	"Se Esfuma Tu Amor"	–	23	–	–	–	–	–	–	–	–		Amar Sin Mentiras & Valió la Pena
2004	"Tu Amor Me Hace Bien"	–	41	–	–	–	–	–	–	–	–		Amar Sin Mentiras & Valió la Pena
2005	"Escapémonos" (featuring Jennifer Lopez)	–	–	–	–	–	–	–	–	–	–		Amar Sin Mentiras & Valió la Pena
2006	"Que Precio Tiene el Cielo"	–	14	–	–	–	–	–	–	–	–		Sigo Siendo Yo (Grandes Exitos)
2006	"Lo Que No Dí"												Sigo Siendo Yo (Grandes Exitos)
2007	"Mi Gente"	–	23	–	–	–	–	–	–	–	–		El Cantante
2007	"Aguanilé"	–	31	–	–	–	–	–	–	–	–		El Cantante
2008	"El Día de Mi Suerte"^{[H]}	–	–	–	–	–	–	–	–	–	–		El Cantante
2008	"Escándalo"	–	–	–	–	–	–	–	–	–	–		El Cantante
2010	"¿Y Cómo Es Él?"	–	7	–	–	–	–	–	–	–	–		Iconos
2010	"Abrázame Muy Fuerte"	–	38	–	–	–	–	–	–	–	–		Iconos
2010	"A Quien Quiero Mentirle"	–	29	–	–	–	–	–	–	–	–		Iconos
2013	"Vivir Mi Vida"	92	1	–	–	–	–	–	–	–	–	AMPROFON: Diamond+4× Platinum+Gold; PROMUSICAE: 2× Platinum; RIAA: 16× Platinum (Latin)	3.0
2013	"Cambio de Piel"	–	7	–	–	–	–	–	–	–	–		3.0
2014	"Flor Pálida"	–	–	–	–	–	–	–	–	–	–		3.0
2018	"Está Rico" (with Will Smith and Bad Bunny)	– (Note: "Está Rico" did not enter the Billboard Hot 100, but peaked at number four on the Bubbling Under Hot 100 chart.)	5	–	–	–	–	–	–	–	–	PROMUSICAE: Platinum	Non-album single
2019	"Tu Vida en la Mía"	–	33	–	–	–	–	–	–	–	–		Opus
2019	"Parecen Viernes"	–	34	–	–	–	–	–	–	–	–	AMPROFON: Platinum+Gold; RIAA: 2× Platinum (Latin)	Opus
2019	"Lo Que Te Dí"	–	–	–	–	–	–	–	–	–	–		Opus
2020	"Convénceme" (with India Martínez)	–	–	–	–	–	–	–	–	–	–		Non-album singles
2020	"Un Amor Eterno (Ballad Version)"	–	–	–	–	–	–	–	–	–	–		Non-album singles
2020	"De Vuelta Pa'la Vuelta" (with Daddy Yankee)	–	34	–	–	–	–	–	–	–	–		Non-album singles
2021	"Pa'llá Voy"	–	–	–	–	–	–	–	–	–	–	RIAA: 3× Platinum (Latin)	Pa'llá Voy
2021	"Mala"	–	29	–	–	–	–	–	–	–	–	RIAA: 2× Platinum (Latin)	Pa'llá Voy
2022	"Nada de Nada"	–	–	–	–	–	–	–	–	–	–	RIAA: Platinum (Latin)	Pa'llá Voy
2025	"Feliz Navidad / I Wanna Wish You a Merry Christmas"	– (Note: "Feliz Navidad / I Wanna Wish You a Merry Christmas" did not enter the Billboard Hot 100, but peaked at number five on the Bubbling Under Hot 100 chart.)	–	–	–	–	–	–	–	–	–		Non-album single

=== Promo singles/Radio airplay songs ===
Year	Single	Album
1993	"El Último Beso"	Otra Nota
1993	"Necesito Amarte"	Otra Nota
1993	"Parece Mentira"	Carlito's Way OST
1999	"Preciosa"	Desdeo el Principio: From the Beginning
1999	"That's Okay"	Marc Anthony
2002	"Everything You Do"	Mended
2006	"Lamento Borincano"	Valió la Pena
2008	"El Cantante"	El Cantante
2008	"Escándalo"	El Cantante

=== As featured artist ===
Year	Single	Peak chart positions										Certifications	Album
Year	Single	US	US Latin	US Latin Pop	US Latin Tropical	AUS	FRA	NL	ESP	SWI	UK	Certifications	Album
1996	"Mejores Que Ella" (La Mafia featuring Marc Anthony)	–	2	6	15	–	–	–	–	–	–		Un Millón de Rosas
1998	"I Want to Spend My Lifetime Loving You" (Tina Arena featuring Marc Anthony)	–	–	–	–	–	3	4	–	34	–		The Mask of Zorro OST
1999	"No Me Ames" (Jennifer Lopez featuring Marc Anthony)	–	1	2	1	–	–	–	–	–	–	AMPROFON: Gold	On the 6
2001	"There You Were" (Jessica Simpson featuring Marc Anthony)	–	–	–	–	–	–	–	–	–	–		Irresistible
2003	"Dance, Dance (The Mexican)" (Thalía featuring Marc Anthony)	–	–	–	–	–	–	–	–	–	–		Thalía
2006	"Oye Guitarra Mía" (José Feliciano featuring Marc Anthony)	–	–	–	–	–	–	–	–	–	–		José Feliciano y Amigos
2008	"Por Arriesgarnos" (Jennifer Lopez featuring Marc Anthony)	–	–	–	–	–	–	–	–	–	–		Como Ama una Mujer
2009	"Historia de Taxi" (Ricardo Arjona featuring Marc Anthony)	–	–	–	–	–	–	–	–	–	–		Quién Dijo Ayer
2009	"Recuérdame" (La 5ª Estación featuring Marc Anthony)	–	5	3	11	–	–	–	5	–	–	PROMUSICAE: 2× Platinum	Sin Frenos
2010	"Armada Latina" (Cypress Hill featuring Marc Anthony and Pitbull)	106	–	–	–	–	–	–	–	–	–		Rise Up
2011	"La Fuerza del Destino" (Sandra Echeverria featuring Marc Anthony)	–	–	–	–	–	–	–	–	–	–		Non-album single
2011	"Rain Over Me" (Pitbull featuring Marc Anthony)	30	1	1	1	9	2	16	1	4	28	AMPROFON: 2× Platinum; BPI: Silver; MC: 2× Platinum; PROMUSICAE: Platinum; RIAA: 2× Platinum	Planet Pit
2012	"¿Por Qué les Mientes?" (Tito El Bambino featuring Marc Anthony)	–	1	–	1	–	–	–	–	–	–	RIAA: Platinum (Latin)	Invicto
2012	"For Once in My Life" (Tony Bennett featuring Marc Anthony)	–	–	–	–	–	–	–	–	–	–		Viva Duets
2012	"En Mi Viejo San Juan" (Arthur Hanlon featuring Marc Anthony)	–	–	–	–	–	–	–	–	–	–		Encanto Del Caribe
2013	"Paraíso Prometido (Hay Que Llegar)" (Draco Rosa featuring Marc Anthony)	–	–	–	–	–	–	–	–	–	–		Vida
2013	"Noche De Paz (Silent Night)" (Mary J. Blige featuring Marc Anthony)	–	–	–	–	–	–	–	–	–	–		A Mary Christmas
2014	"Se Fue" (Laura Pausini featuring Marc Anthony)	–	25	6	10	–	–	–	–	–	–		20 - The Greatest Hits
2014	"Cuando Nos Volvamos a Encontrar" (Carlos Vives featuring Marc Anthony)	–	10	2	1	–	–	–	–	–	–		Más + Corazón Profundo
2014	"Yo También" (Romeo Santos featuring Marc Anthony)	–	14	16	4	–	–	–	–	–	–	AMPROFON: 3× Platinum+Gold; RIAA: 19× Platinum (Latin)	Formula, Vol. 2
2015	"La Gozadera" (Gente de Zona featuring Marc Anthony)	–	2	3	1	–	–	–	–	–	–	AMPROFON: Diamond+Platinum+Gold; PROMUSICAE: 5× Platinum; RIAA: 12× Platinum (Latin)	Visualízate
2015	"Traidora" (Gente de Zona featuring Marc Anthony)	–	6	–	1	–	–	–	–	–	–	AMPROFON: Gold; PROMUSICAE: 2× Platinum	Visualízate
2016	"Yo Te Recuerdo" (Juan Gabriel featuring Marc Anthony)	–	49	–	–	–	–	–	–	–	–		Los Dúo, Vol. 2
2016	"Deja Que Te Bese" (Alejandro Sanz featuring Marc Anthony)	–	23	–	11	–	–	–	–	–	–		Non-album single
2017	"Felices los 4 (Salsa version)" (Maluma featuring Marc Anthony)	48	2	1	–	–	119	1	2	39	–	AMPROFON: Platinum; PROMUSICAE: 5× Platinum	F.A.M.E.
2017	"Almost Like Praying" (as part of Artists for Puerto Rico)	20	–	–	–	–	–	–	–	–	–		Almost Like Praying
2018	"Adicto" (Prince Royce featuring Marc Anthony)	33	–	–	–	–	–	–	–	–	–	RIAA: 5× Platinum (Latin)	Alter Ego
2021	"Home All Summer" (Leslie Grace and Anthony Ramos featuring Marc Anthony)	–	–	–	–	–	–	–	–	–	–		In the Heights (OST)
2023	"La Fórmula" (Maluma featuring Marc Anthony)	–	–	–	–	–	–	–	83	–	–		Don Juan

== Songwriting credits ==
Year	Song	Artist	Album	Notes
2007	"Qué Hiciste"	Jennifer Lopez	Como Ama una Mujer	US number 86
2007	"Me Haces Falta"	Jennifer Lopez	Como Ama una Mujer	
2007	"Porque Te Marchas"	Jennifer Lopez	Como Ama una Mujer	
2007	"Tú"	Jennifer Lopez	Como Ama una Mujer	
2007	"Sola"	Jennifer Lopez	Como Ama una Mujer	
2007	"Yo Te Quiero"	Juan Vélez	Con Mi Soledad	
2015	"You Don't Eat"	Jadakiss featuring Puff Daddy	Top 5 Dead or Alive	

== Music videos ==
Year	Title	Album
1993	"Hasta Que Te Conocí"	Otra Nota
1993	"El Último Beso"	Otra Nota
1993	"Make It with You"	Otra Nota
1993	"Vivir Lo Nuestro" (with La India)	Combinación Perfecta
1996	"Hasta Ayer"	Todo a Su Tiempo
1997	"Y Hubo Alguien"	Contra la Corriente
1998	"Nadie Como Ella"	Todo a Su Tiempo
1998	"No Me Conoces"	Contra la Corriente
1999	"I Need to Know"	Marc Anthony
2000	"You Sang to Me"/"Muy Dentro de Mí"	Marc Anthony
2000	"When I Dream at Night"	Marc Anthony
2001	"Tragedy"/"Tragedia"	Mended / Libre
2002	"I Need You"/"Me Haces Falta"	Mended
2002	"I've Got You"/"Te Tengo Aquí"	Mended
2004	"Ahora Quien" (Pop and Salsa versions)	Amar Sin Mentiras & Valió la Pena
2004	"Valió la Pena" (Pop and Salsa versions)	Amar Sin Mentiras & Valió la Pena
2011	"A Quién Quiero Mentirle"	non-album
2013	"Vivir Mi Vida"	3.0
2014	"Cambio de Piel"	3.0
2014	"Flor Pálida"	3.0
2018	"Está Rico" (with Will Smith and Bad Bunny)	non-album
2019	"Tu Vida en la Mía"	Opus
2019	"Parecen Viernes"	Opus
2019	"Lo Que Te Di"	Opus
2020	"Convénceme" (with India Martínez)	non-album
2020	"Un Amor Eterno (Ballad Version)"	non-album
2020	"De Vuelta Pa'la Vuelta" (with Daddy Yankee)	non-album
2021	"Pa'llá Voy"	Pa'llá Voy
2021	"Mala"	Pa'llá Voy
2022	"Nada de Nada"	Pa'llá Voy
2023	"Ojalá Te Duela" (with Pepe Aguilar)	Muévense
2023	"Punta Cana"	Muévense
2024	"Ale Ale"	Muévense

== Notes ==
- C^{[C]}"Ride on the Rhythm" reached #1 on the Billboard Dance/Club charts.
- D^{[D]}"Vieja Mesa" peaked at #7 on the Billboard Latin Tropical Airplay charts.
- E^{[E]}"Barco a la Deriva" peaked at #8 on the Billboard Latin Tropical Airplay charts.
- F^{[F]}"Amigo" peaked at #4 on the Billboard Latin Tropical Airplay charts.
- G^{[G]}"Volando Entre Tus Brazos" peaked at #11 on the Billboard Latin Tropical Airplay charts.
- H^{[H]}"El Día de Mi Suerte" peaked at #28 on the Billboard Latin Tropical Airplay charts.
