= Born to Be Alive =

Born to Be Alive may refer to:

- Born to Be Alive (album), 1978 debut studio album by French singer Patrick Hernandez
- "Born to Be Alive" (song), the title track of the above-mentioned album
- Born to Be Alive (TV series), a 2026 Chinese television drama
