= List of number-one singles of 1979 (Spain) =

This is a list of the Spanish Singles number-ones of 1979.

== Chart history ==
Issue date	Song	Artist
1 January	"Tú"	Umberto Tozzi
8 January	"Tú"	Umberto Tozzi
15 January	"Tú"	Umberto Tozzi
22 January	"Tú"	Umberto Tozzi
29 January	"Tú"	Umberto Tozzi
5 February	"It's Downtown"	New Trolls
12 February	"Catch the Cat"	Cherry Laine
19 February	"Catch the Cat"	Cherry Laine
26 February	"I Was Made for Dancin'"	Leif Garrett
5 March	"Da Ya Think I'm Sexy?"	Rod Stewart
12 March	"Da Ya Think I'm Sexy?"	Rod Stewart
19 March	"Da Ya Think I'm Sexy?"	Rod Stewart
26 March	"Da Ya Think I'm Sexy?"	Rod Stewart
2 April	"Da Ya Think I'm Sexy?"	Rod Stewart
9 April	"Da Ya Think I'm Sexy?"	Rod Stewart
16 April	"Too Much Heaven"	Bee Gees
23 April	"Sólo Pienso en Tí"	Víctor Manuel
30 April	"Sólo Pienso en Tí"	Víctor Manuel
7 May	"Sólo Pienso en Tí"	Víctor Manuel
14 May	"Chiquitita"	ABBA
21 May	"Sólo Pienso en Tí"	Víctor Manuel
28 May	"Sólo Pienso en Tí"	Víctor Manuel
4 June	"Tragedy"	Bee Gees
11 June	"Born to Be Alive"	Patrick Hernandez
18 June	"Born to Be Alive"	Patrick Hernandez
25 June	"Born to Be Alive"	Patrick Hernandez
2 July	"Born to Be Alive"	Patrick Hernandez
9 July	"Born to Be Alive"	Patrick Hernandez
16 July	"Estoy Bailando"	Hermanas Goggi
23 July	"Súper, Superman"	Miguel Bosé
30 July	"Súper, Superman"	Miguel Bosé
6 August	"Súper, Superman"	Miguel Bosé
13 August	"Súper, Superman"	Miguel Bosé
20 August	"Gloria"	Umberto Tozzi
27 August	"Gloria"	Umberto Tozzi
3 September	"Gloria"	Umberto Tozzi
10 September	"Gloria"	Umberto Tozzi
17 September	"Ring My Bell"	Anita Ward
24 September	"Ring My Bell"	Anita Ward
1 October	"Lady Laura"	Roberto Carlos
8 October	"Lady Laura"	Roberto Carlos
15 October	"Me Llamas"	José Luis Perales
22 October	"Me Llamas"	José Luis Perales
29 October	"Me Llamas"	José Luis Perales
5 November	"Que No"	Pedro Marín
12 November	"Shine a Little Love"	Electric Light Orchestra
19 November	"Agapimú"	Ana Belén
26 November	"Agapimú"	Ana Belén
3 December	"Agapimú"	Ana Belén
10 December	"Reunited"	Peaches & Herb
17 December	"Sin Amor (Dghingis Khan)"	Iván
25 December	"Sin Amor (Dghingis Khan)"	Iván
31 December	"Sin Amor (Dghingis Khan)"	Iván

== See also ==
- 1979 in music
- List of number-one hits (Spain)
