= List of number-one hits of 1979 (Mexico) =

This is a list of the songs that reached number one in Mexico in 1979, according to Núcleo Radio Mil as published in the Billboard and Notitas Musicales magazines. Also included are the number-one songs according to the Record World magazine.

== Chart history (Billboard) ==
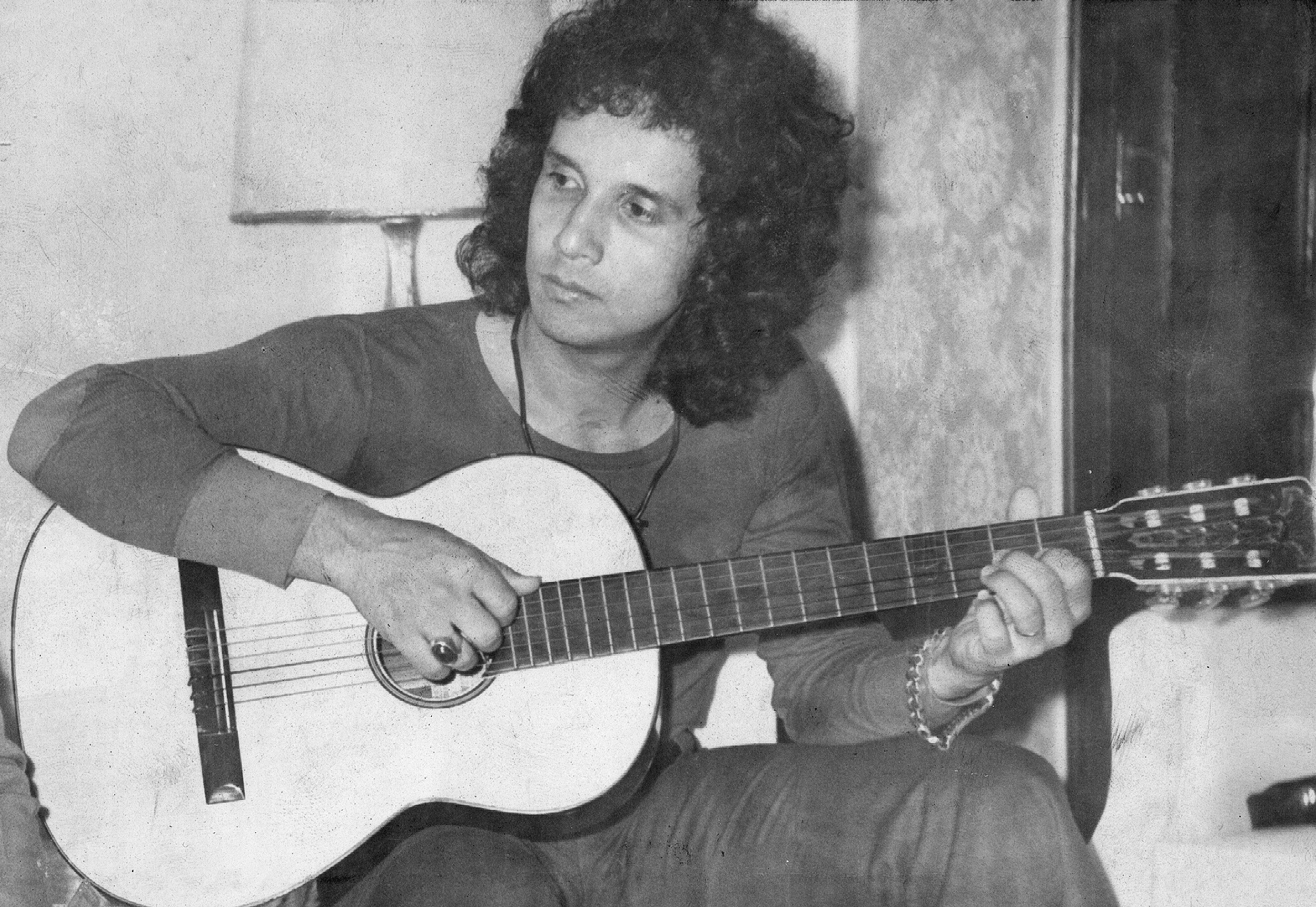
Brazilian singer-songwriter Roberto Carlos' song "Amigo", which had previously topped the charts in 1978, re-entered the charts and once again reached number one in 1979 as it was chosen as the official song to welcome Pope John Paul II on his 1979 visit to Mexico.

Issue date	Song	Artist(s)	Label	Ref.
January 25	"Lo pasado, pasado"	José José	Ariola	
March 30	"Amigo"	Roberto Carlos	CBS	
April 6	"Amigo"	Roberto Carlos	CBS	
June 13	"El amor de mi vida"	Camilo Sesto	Ariola	
June 20	"El amor de mi vida"	Camilo Sesto	Ariola	
July 5	"Chiquitita"	ABBA	RCA	
July 12	"Chiquitita"	ABBA	RCA	
September 8	"Chiquitita"	ABBA	RCA	
September 15	"Born to Be Alive"	Patrick Hernandez	Gamma	
September 22	"Born to Be Alive"	Patrick Hernandez	Gamma	
September 29	"Born to Be Alive"	Patrick Hernandez	Gamma	
October 19	"Quererte a ti"	Ángela Carrasco	Ariola	
October 26	"Heaven Must Have Sent You"	Bonnie Pointer	Motown	
December 17	"Si me dejas ahora"	José José	Ariola	
December 24	"Si me dejas ahora"	José José	Ariola	

== Chart history (Record World) ==
Issue Date	Popularity		Sales		Ref.
Issue Date	Song	Artist(s)	Song	Artist(s)	Ref.
January 6	"Motivos"	José Domingo	"Mi fracaso"	Juan Gabriel	
February 3	"Como tú"	Lupita D'Alessio	"Y las mariposas"	Joan Sebastian	
February 17	N/A		"Como tú"	Lupita D'Alessio	
February 24	"Motivos"	José Domingo	N/A		
April 7	"Motivos"	José Domingo	"Lo pasado, pasado"	José José	
May 26	"Noches de verano"	Angélica María & Raúl Vale	"Amigo"	Estudiantina Instituto Miguel Ángel & Rondalla Infantil del Colegio de México	
June 16	"El amor está en el aire"	Enrique Guzmán	"La gallina co-co-ua"	Cepillín	
July 7	N/A		"Disco Samba"	Los Joao/Two Man Sound	
July 14	"Brujería"	Álvaro Dávila	N/A		
August 25	"Chiquitita"	ABBA	"Disco Samba"	Los Joao/Two Man Sound	
September 15	"Hasta que amanezca"	Joan Sebastian	"La de la mochila azul"	Pedrito Fernández	
October 20	N/A		"Chiquitita"	ABBA	
November 3	N/A		"Chiquitita"	ABBA	
November 10	"Que me perdone tu señora"	Manoella Torres	N/A		
December 22	"Quererte a ti"	Ángela Carrasco	"Quererte a ti"	Ángela Carrasco	

== Sources ==
- Print editions of the Billboard and Record World magazines.
