= Sigo Siendo Yo: Grandes Éxitos =

Sigo Siendo Yo (Grandes Éxitos)

Greatest hits album by Marc Anthony
- Released: July 11, 2006
- Recorded: 1998–2006
- Genres: Salsa; Latin pop
- Length: 67:16
- Labels: Sony BMG Norte; Columbia
- Producers: Sergio George; Marc Anthony; Various

Marc Anthony chronology
Valió La Pena (2004)	Sigo Siendo Yo (Grandes Éxitos) (2006)	El Cantante (2007)

Singles from Sigo Siendo Yo (Grandes Exitos)
- 1. "Qué Precio Tiene el Cielo" Released: June 2, 2006

Sigo Siendo Yo (I'm Still Myself) is a greatest hits album by Marc Anthony released in 2006. Unlike previous Marc Anthony compilations, this album features songs from the albums Marc Anthony to Valió La Pena. Therefore, this compilation album does not contain songs from his RMM years. The album also contains two original songs. Que Precio Tiene el Cielo was awarded Tropical Airplay of the Year in the 2007 Latin Billboard Music Awards.

== Track listing ==
No.	Title	Writer(s)	Length
1.	"Dímelo"	Marc Anthony; Robert Blades; Anjeanette Chirino; Cory Rooney	3:48
2.	"No Me Ames (Ballad version)" (featuring Jennifer Lopez)	Aleandro Baldi; Giancarlo Bigazzi; Marco Falagiani	4:37
3.	"Da la Vuelta"	Emilio Estefan; Kike Santander	5:11
4.	"Muy Dentro de Mí"	Anthony; Rooney	5:56
5.	"Celos"	Anthony; Alejandro Jaén	4:46
6.	"Tragedia"	Rooney; Rob Thomas	3:48
7.	"Barco a la Deriva"	josé Florez; César Valle	4:34
8.	"Ahora Quién"	Estéfano; Julio C. Reyes	5:07
9.	"Valió la Pena (Salsa version)"	Anthony; Estéfano; José Luis Pagan	4:51
10.	"Se Esfuma Tu Amor"	Estéfano; Pagan	3:53
11.	"Tu Amor Me Hace Bien (Salsa version)"	Estéfano	5:02
12.	"Lamento Borincano"	Rafael Hernández	5:06
13.	"Lo Que No Di"	Anthony; Reyes	5:35
14.	"Qué Precio Tiene el Cielo"	Alfredo Matheus Diez	5:02

== Personnel ==
- Spanish Adaptation - Alberto Gaitan
- Acoustic Guitar, Main Personnel - Alfredo Matheus
- Composer, Engineer, Acoustic Guitar, Mixing - Alfredo Matheus Diez
- Guitar - Andrew Synowiec
- Photography - Anthony Mandler
- Management - Bigram Zayas
- Composer - Cory Rooney
- Trumpet - Dante Vargas
- Composer - Emilio Estefan Jr.
- Composer - Giancarlo Bigazzi
- Stylist - Gina Rizzo
- Adaptation - Ignacio Ballesteros
- Choir / Chorus, Guest Artist, Main Personnel, Primary Artist, Vocals - Jennifer Lopez
- Composer - Julio C. Reyes
- Arranger, Composer, Keyboards, Mixing, Piano, Producer, Programming, String Arrangements - Julio Reyes Copello
- Production Coordination - Katherine Derby
- Composer - Kike Santander
- Coordination - LaTisha Cotto
- Drums - Lee Levin
- Hair Stylist, Make-Up - Maital Sabbon
- Composer, Executive Producer, Main Personnel, Primary Artist, Vocals - Marc Anthony
- Composer - Marco Falagiani
- Art Direction - Marla P. Marulanda
- Spanish Adaptation - Omar Alfanno
- Trombone - Ozzie Melendez
- Engineer - Peter Wade Keusch
- Spanish Adaptation - Ricardo Galtan
- Composer, Spanish Adaptation - Robert Blades
- Bongos, Timbales - Robert Vilera
- Assistant Engineer - Ryan Kennedy
- Bass - Sal Cuevas
- Congas, Guiro, Main Personnel, Maracas - Sammy Garcia
- Arranger, Audio Production, Choir / Chorus, Keyboards, Main Personnel, Piano, Producer - Sergio George
- Spanish Adaptation - Thalia Alfano
- Mastering - Vic Anesini
- Choir / Chorus - William Duval

== Charts ==
=== Weekly charts ===
Chart (2006)	Peak position
US Billboard 200	101
US Top Latin Albums (Billboard)	2
US Tropical Albums (Billboard)	1

=== Year-end charts ===
Chart (2006)	Position
US Top Latin Albums (Billboard)	32

== Sales and certifications ==
Region	Certification	Certified units/sales
Argentina (CAPIF)	Gold	20,000^{^}
Central America (CFC)	Gold	7,500
Spain (Promusicae)	Platinum	80,000^{^}
^{^} Shipments figures based on certification alone.

== See also ==
- List of number-one Billboard Tropical Albums from the 2000s
