= I'm Hot =

I'm Hot may refer to:

- I'm Hot, album by Germany-based disco diva Cherry Laine CBS, 1979
- "I'm Hot", song by Erick Sermon from Music, 2001
- "I'm Hot", song by Jermaine Dupri from Young, Fly & Flashy, Vol. 1, 2005
- "I'm Hot", song by Moka Only from Carrots and Eggs, 2008
