= List of number-one singles of 1979 (France) =

This is a list of the French Singles & Airplay Chart Review number-ones of 1979.

== Summary ==
=== Singles chart ===
Week	Date	Artist	Single
1	5 January	Village People	"Y.M.C.A."
2	12 January	Village People	"Y.M.C.A."
3	19 January	Village People	"Y.M.C.A."
4	26 January	Village People	"Y.M.C.A."
5	2 February	Bee Gees	"Tragedy"
6	9 February	Bee Gees	"Tragedy"
7	16 February	Bee Gees	"Tragedy"
8	23 February	Bee Gees	"Tragedy"
9	2 March	Patrick Hernandez	"Born to Be Alive"
10	9 March	Patrick Hernandez	"Born to Be Alive"
11	16 March	Patrick Hernandez	"Born to Be Alive"
12	23 March	Patrick Hernandez	"Born to Be Alive"
13	30 March	Patrick Hernandez	"Born to Be Alive"
14	6 April	Patrick Hernandez	"Born to Be Alive"
15	14 April	Patrick Hernandez	"Born to Be Alive"
16	20 April	Patrick Hernandez	"Born to Be Alive"
17	27 April	Patrick Hernandez	"Born to Be Alive"
18	4 May	Patrick Hernandez	"Born to Be Alive"
19	11 May	Village People	"In the Navy"
20	18 May	Village People	"In the Navy"
21	25 May	Village People	"In the Navy"
22	1 June	Village People	"In the Navy"
23	8 June	Patrick Hernandez	"Born to Be Alive"
24	15 June	Patrick Hernandez	"Born to Be Alive"
25	22 June	Patrick Hernandez	"Born to Be Alive"
26	29 June	Patrick Hernandez	"Born to Be Alive"
27	6 July	Patrick Hernandez	"Born to Be Alive"
28	13 July	Billy Joel	"Honesty"
29	20 July	Billy Joel	"Honesty"
30	27 July	Billy Joel	"Honesty"
31	3 August	Billy Joel	"Honesty"
32	10 August	Billy Joel	"Honesty"
33	17 August	Billy Joel	"Honesty"
34	24 August	Billy Joel	"Honesty"
35	31 August	Billy Joel	"Honesty"
36	7 September	Francis Cabrel	"Je l'aime à mourir"
37	14 September	Francis Cabrel	"Je l'aime à mourir"
38	21 September	Francis Cabrel	"Je l'aime à mourir"
39	28 September	Francis Cabrel	"Je l'aime à mourir"
40	5 October	Francis Cabrel	"Je l'aime à mourir"
41	12 October	Christophe	"Aline"
42	19 October	Christophe	"Aline"
43	26 October	Christophe	"Aline"
44	2 November	Christophe	"Aline"
45	9 November	Christophe	"Aline"
46	16 November	The Buggles	"Video Killed the Radio Star"
47	23 November	The Buggles	"Video Killed the Radio Star"
48	30 November	The Buggles	"Video Killed the Radio Star"
49	7 December	The Buggles	"Video Killed the Radio Star"
50	14 December	The Buggles	"Video Killed the Radio Star"
51	21 December	The Buggles	"Video Killed the Radio Star"
52	28 December	The Buggles	"Video Killed the Radio Star"

== See also ==
- 1979 in music
- List of number-one hits (France)
