= Lost (Menudo song) =

Song by Menudo

Single by Menudo
- Released: June 24, 2008
- Recorded: 2008
- Genre: Pop; R&B
- Label: Epic
- Songwriters: Bruno Mars; Cory Rooney
- Producer: Cory Rooney

Menudo singles chronology
"More Than Words (AEIOU)" (2008)	"Lost" (2008)

"Lost" (also released in Spanish as "Perdido Sin Ti") is a song by the Puerto Rican boy band, Menudo. It was released as a digital single with virtually no album support in June 2008. While failing to reach the Billboard Hot 100, it did peak at number 36 on the Mainstream Top 40 airplay chart.

In his review of the single, Chuck Taylor of Billboard stated that the track features a catchy and engaging chorus, perfect for captivating a young audience. He noted that, with Latin culture on the rise, Menudo had the potential to achieve widespread success. Additionally, he highlighted that the members—aged 16 to 19—demonstrate great skill in both dancing and singing, while also being charismatic and distinct enough to establish their own individual identities.

== Charts ==
Chart (2008)	Peak position
US Mainstream Top 40 (Billboard)	36

== Release history ==
Release dates and formats for "Lost"
Region	Date	Format	Label(s)	Ref.
United States	June 24, 2008	Mainstream airplay	Epic	
