= Typical Reasons (Swing My Way) =

Song by Prince Markie Dee

Single by Prince Markie Dee

from the album Free
- Released: September 15, 1993
- Length: 4:35
- Label: Columbia
- Songwriter: Mark Morales
- Producers: Kenny Meiselas; Cory Rooney; Prince Markie Dee

Prince Markie Dee singles chronology
"Trippin' Out" (1992)	"Typical Reasons (Swing My Way)" (1993)	"Something Special" (1993)

Music video
- "Typical Reasons (Swing My Way)" on YouTube

"Typical Reasons (Swing My Way)" is a song by American hip hop group Prince Markie Dee and the Soul Convention from their studio album Free (1992), released on September 15, 1993, as the album's second single. It is Prince Markie Dee's most successful song as a solo artist.

== Composition and critical reception ==
In regard to style, the song has been considered similar to that of rapper Heavy D's music. Steve "Flash" Juon of RapReviews wrote of the song, "Listening to the song you can't help but think of Bobby Brown, Teddy Riley and Keith Sweat – it's classic 1990's new jack swing all the way. Given the contentious relationship between Chris Brown and Rihanna, the lyrics from the suave and seductive Markie Dee seem apt even today."

== Charts ==
Chart (1993)	Peak position
US Billboard Hot 100	64
US Hot R&B/Hip-Hop Songs (Billboard)	29
US Maxi-Singles Sales (Billboard)	39
