= Da la Vuelta =

1999 single by Marc Anthony

Promotional single by Marc Anthony

from the album Marc Anthony
- Language: Spanish
- English title: "Turn Around"
- Released: 1999
- Genre: Salsa
- Length: 5:10
- Label: Columbia
- Songwriters: Emilio Estefan; Kike Santander
- Producers: Marc Anthony; Emilio Estefan; Ángel "Cucco" Peña

"Da la Vuelta" (English: "Turn Around") is a song written by Emilio Estefan and Kike Santander and performed by American singer Marc Anthony. Produced by Anthony, Estefan, and Ángel "Cucco" Peña, it is a salsa track which deals with the singer letting go of his former lover. It is one of the three Spanish-language songs to be included on Anthony's 1999 self-titled album and was released as a promotional single in the same year.

Despite the album being met with unfavorable reviews, "Da la Vuelta" garnered positive reactions from music critics who praised it as a danceable number. The record received a Latin Grammy nomination for Best Tropical Song in 2000 and was nominated for Tropical Song of the Year at the Lo Nuestro Awards the following year. Commercially, it reached number 22 and number six on the Billboard Hot Latin Songs and Tropical Songs charts in the United States respectively.

== Music, lyrics, and release ==
Marc Anthony "Da la Vuelta"
A 30 second sample of the song, "Da la Vuelta" by Marc Anthony. The song begins as a "soft ballad" featuring a bolero guitar before it transitions into a salsa number for the rest of the track.

"Da la Vuelta" is a salsa track composed by Emilio Estefan and Kike Santander and produced by Anthony, Estefan, and Ángel "Cucco" Peña. Peña had previously collaborated with Anthony as a producer for his third studio album Contra la Corriente in 1997. It is one of the three Spanish-language records included on Marc Anthony along with the Spanish-language versions of "I Need to Know" ("Dímelo") and "She's Been Good to Me" ("Cómo Ella Me Quiere a Mi"). The song begins as a "soft ballad" with a bolero guitar and mariachi horn arrangements before transitioning into a salsa number. Lyrically, it is about the singer letting go of his former lover. "Da la Vuelta" was released as a promotional single for the album in 1999. Anthony performed the song live at Madison Square Garden; this performance was included on the video set The Concert from Madison Square Garden.

== Reception ==
The Richmond Times-Dispatch journalist Melissa Ruggierit called "Da la Vuelta" a "traditional romp co-written by Emilio Estefan that is a scorcher." Chloe Cabrera of The Tampa Tribune felt that "Da la Vuelta", along with "Dímelo", has "the feel of his Grammy-award winning 1997 album, Contra la Corriente." Mario Tarradell, who gave Marc Anthony a negative review on The Dallas Morning News, lamented that the record was filled with ballads instead of dance numbers like "Da la Vuelta", "Dímelo", and "That's Okay". However, he also remarked that "we know he can do the salsa stuff" and insisted that they were "not a challenge" for Anthony. Parry Gettelman, who also wrote an unfavorable review of the album, mentioned that "Da la Vuelta" was "certainly worthy of Anthony's voice."

The Dayton Daily News editor Sofia Villalobos opined that the track "combines an older, Tito Puente style with the latest fads of the aforementioned Lopez. Similarly, The San Diego Union-Tribune writer Ernesto Portillo, Jr. called it a "danceable salsa number" while Rueben Rosario highlighted the record as "hip-grinding" and "vintage Anthony" on St. Paul Pioneer Press. Grace Bastidas of The Village Voice praised it as a "beautiful little letting-go number".

"Da la Vuelta" received a nomination for Best Tropical Song at the inaugural Latin Grammy Awards in 2000, which was awarded to "El Niágara en Bicicleta" by Juan Luis Guerra. It also was nominated Tropical Song of the Year at the 13th Annual Lo Nuestro Awards in 2001 but lost to "A Puro Dolor" by Son by Four. Santander and Estefan were presented with a BMI Latin Award in 2001 as it was recognized as one of the best-performing songs of the year. The track was included on Anthony's greatest hits album Sigo Siendo Yo: Grandes Exitos (2006).

Commercially, "Da la Vuelta" peaked at number 22 on the Billboard Hot Latin Songs chart in the United States. It fared better on the Billboard Latin Tropical Songs chart by reaching number 6 and ended 2000 as the ninth best-performing tropical song of the year in the country.

== Charts ==
=== Weekly charts ===
Chart (2000)	Peak position
US Hot Latin Songs (Billboard)	22
US Tropical Airplay (Billboard)	6

=== Year-end charts ===
Chart (2000)	Position
US Tropical Airplay (Billboard)	9

== Personnel ==
Credits adapted from the Marc Anthony liner notes.

- Marc Anthony – arrangement, co-production, vocals
- Luis Aquina – trumpet
- Joe Caldas – audio engineer
- Wichy Camacho – background vocals
- Enrique Collazo – violin
- Antonio Salcedo Corpas – string contractor
- J. Dederic – violin
- Jorge Diaz – trombone
- Emilio Estefan – co-production, songwriting
- Tito de Garcia – bongos, timbales
- Jose Gazmei – bass
- Orlando Guillot – cello
- Henry Hutchinson – violin
- José Janga – violin
- Gerardo Lopez – audio engineer
- Tony Mardini – assistant audio engineer
- Emma Matos – violin
- Fernando Medina – violin
- Naldi Morales – cello
- Fernando Muscolo – keyboards
- Ángel "Cucco" Peña – arrangement, co-production
- Lito Peña Jr. – assistant audio engineer
- Charlie Sierra – percussion
- Kachiro Thompson – conga
- Rafi Torres – trombone
- Chequi Ramos – background vocals
- Hector I. Rosa – audio engineer
- Josue Rosado – background vocals
- Sheila Ortiz – cello
- Fermin Segarra – cello
- Maximo Torres – guitar
- Victor Vasquez – trombone
- Chris Wiggins – assistant audio engineer
