= List of number-one hits of 1978 (Mexico) =

This is a list of the songs that reached number one in Mexico in 1978, according to Núcleo Radio Mil as published in the Billboard and Notitas Musicales magazines. Also included are the number-one songs according to the Record World magazine.

== Chart history (Billboard) ==
Issue date	Song	Artist(s)	Label	Ref.
January 13	"Ma Baker"	Boney M./Grupo El Tren	RCA / Orfeón	
January 20	"Ma Baker"	Boney M./Grupo El Tren	RCA / Orfeón	
January 27	"Si tú te vas"	Camilo Sesto	Ariola	
February 3	"Ma Baker"	Boney M./Grupo El Tren	RCA / Orfeón	
February 10	"Si tú te vas"	Camilo Sesto	Ariola	
February 24	"Si tú te vas"	Camilo Sesto	Ariola	
March 3	"Si tú te vas"	Camilo Sesto	Ariola	
March 10	"Amigo"	Roberto Carlos	CBS	
March 17	"Blue Bayou"	Linda Ronstadt	Asylum	
April 7	"Blue Bayou"	Linda Ronstadt	Asylum	
April 14	"Blue Bayou"	Linda Ronstadt	Asylum	
April 21	"Blue Bayou"	Linda Ronstadt	Asylum	
May 5	"Aunque te enamores"	Juan Gabriel	Ariola	
May 19	"Stayin' Alive"	Bee Gees	RSO	
May 26	"Stayin' Alive"	Bee Gees	RSO	
June 16	"El negro José"	Los Virtuosos de la Salsa	GAS	
July 21	"Stayin' Alive"	Bee Gees	RSO	
August 4	"Stayin' Alive"	Bee Gees	RSO	
August 18	"Stayin' Alive"	Bee Gees	RSO	
September 1	"Stayin' Alive"	Bee Gees	RSO	
October 13	"Rivers of Babylon"	Boney M.	RCA	

== Chart history (Record World) ==
Issue Date	Popularity		Sales		Ref.
Issue Date	Song	Artist(s)	Song	Artist(s)	Ref.
January 7	"Pajarillo"	Napoleón	"Pajarillo"	Napoleón	
January 21	"Son tus perjúmenes, mujer"	Los Alvarado	"Son tus perjúmenes, mujer"	Los Alvarado	
February 25	N/A		"Eres toda una mujer"	Raúl Vale	
March 23	"María José"	Juan Gabriel	"Si tú te vas"	Camilo Sesto	
May 20	"El pasadiscos"	Diego Verdaguer	"El pasadiscos"	Diego Verdaguer	
June 10	"El pasadiscos"	Diego Verdaguer	"Aunque te enamores"	Juan Gabriel	
July 1	"Aunque te enamores"	Juan Gabriel	"Aunque te enamores"	Juan Gabriel	
September 2	"Juro que nunca volveré"	Lupita D'Alessio	"Juro que nunca volveré"	Lucha Villa	
September 23	"Juro que nunca volveré"	Lupita D'Alessio	"Juro que nunca volveré"	Lucha Villa	
October 7	"Golondrina de ojos negros"	Rigo Tovar con Mariachi	"Juro que nunca volveré"	Lucha Villa/Lupita D'Alessio	
October 28	"Corazón herido"	Aria 8	"Juro que nunca volveré"	Lucha Villa/Lupita D'Alessio	
November 11	"Juro que nunca volveré"	Lupita D'Alessio	"Juro que nunca volveré"	Lucha Villa/Lupita D'Alessio	
December 2	"Yo quisiera, señor locutor"	Verónica Castro	"Por muchas razones te quiero"	Palito Ortega	
December 23	"Yo quisiera, señor locutor"	Verónica Castro	"Mi fracaso"	Juan Gabriel	

== Sources ==
- Print editions of the Billboard and Record World magazines.
