= I've Got You (Marc Anthony song) =

2002 single by Marc Anthony

Single by Marc Anthony

from the album Mended
- Released: June 17, 2002
- Recorded: 2001
- Genre: Latin pop
- Length: 3:56
- Label: Columbia Records
- Songwriter(s): Cory Rooney; Kara DioGuardi
- Producer(s): Cory Rooney

Marc Anthony singles chronology
"I Need You" (2002)	"I've Got You" (2002)	"Tragedy" (2002)

"I've Got You" is a song by American singer Marc Anthony, released on June 17, 2002 as the second single from his sixth studio album and his second English-language studio album Mended. It was an international hit, and also the most successful single from the album. A Spanish version, "Te Tengo Aquí", was also recorded for the album.

== Track listing ==
CD single
No.	Title	Length
1.	"I've Got You"	3:49

Remixes
No.	Title	Length
1.	"I've Got You" (Chris Panaghi & Eric Kupper Mixes)	5:38

== Charts ==
Chart (2002)	Peak position
Australia (ARIA)	33
Austria (Ö3 Austria Top 40)	46
Canada Radio (Nielsen BDS)	19
Canada AC (Nielsen BDS)	22
Canada CHR/Top 40 (Nielsen BDS)	33
Germany (GfK)	38
Hungary (Rádiós Top 40)	18
Hungary (Single Top 40)	12
Netherlands (Single Top 100)	44
New Zealand (Recorded Music NZ)	22
Sweden (Sverigetopplistan)	30
Switzerland (Schweizer Hitparade)	45
US Billboard Hot 100	81
US Adult Contemporary (Billboard)	23
US Dance Club Songs (Billboard)	22
US Latin Pop Airplay (Billboard) "Te Tengo Aquí"	37
