= Free (Prince Markie Dee album) =

Studio album by Prince Markie Dee and the Soul Convention
- Released: August 11, 1992
- Recorded: 1991–92
- Studio: Soul Convention
- Genres: Hip hop, R&B
- Length: 1:04:02
- Label: Columbia
- Producers: Cory Rooney; Prince Markie Dee

Prince Markie Dee chronology
| Free (1992) | Love Daddy (1995) |

Singles from Free
- 1. "Trippin' Out" Released: August 6, 1992; 2. "Typical Reasons (Swing My Way)" Released: 1993; 3. "Something Special" Released: June 29, 1993

Professional ratings
Review scores
| Source | Rating |
|---|---|
| AllMusic | 2/5 stars |
| Chicago Tribune | 2/4 stars |
| Entertainment Weekly | B− |
| RapReviews | 7/10 |

Free is a studio album by Prince Markie Dee and the Soul Convention. It was released on August 11, 1992, via Columbia Records, making it Markie Dee's first album after he left the Fat Boys. The album was produced by Cory Rooney and Markie Dee, who also served as executive producers together with Kenny Meiselas. The album peaked at number 47 on the Top R&B Albums in the United States. It spawned three singles: "Trippin' Out", "Typical Reasons (Swing My Way)" and "Something Special".

== Track listing ==
| No. | Title | Length |
|---|---|---|
| 1. | "So Very Happy" | 4:06 |
| 2. | "Trippin Out" | 5:38 |
| 3. | "Typical Reasons (Swing My Way)" | 4:57 |
| 4. | "Trilogy of Love" | 6:57 |
| 5. | "Free" | 4:49 |
| 6. | "Addict 4 Your Luv" | 4:22 |
| 7. | "Back to Brooklyn" | 4:59 |
| 8. | "Foreplay" | 6:02 |
| 9. | "I Don't Wanna Lose Your Love" | 4:42 |
| 10. | "Ghetto Bound" | 3:52 |
| 11. | "Something Special" | 4:23 |
| 12. | "I'm Gonna Be Alright" | 5:04 |
| 13. | "The Aftermath" | 4:11 |
| Total length: | | 1:04:02 |

== Charts ==
| Chart (1992) | Peak position |
|---|---|
| US Top R&B Albums (Billboard) | 47 |

=== Singles ===
| Year | Single | Chart positions | |
| Year | Single | US Pop | US R&B |
|---|---|---|---|
| 1992 | "Trippin Out" | — | 25 |
| 1993 | "Typical Reasons (Swing My Way)" | 64 | 29 |
