= Born to Be Alive (album) =

Studio album by Patrick Hernandez
- Released: 17 November 1978
- Recorded: 1978
- Length: 35:05 (original release)
- Label: Aquarius Records (Fr); A-Tom-Mik (US); Columbia (US)
- Producer: Jean Vanloo

Singles from Born to Be Alive
- 1. "Born to Be Alive" Released: November 1978; 2. "Disco Queen" Released: June 1979

Born to Be Alive is the first studio album by Patrick Hernandez, released in France on 17 November 1978, followed by a release in the United States on 26 January 1979. It features the eponymous disco hit "Born to Be Alive" as well as a less-successful single, "Disco Queen".

== Background ==
While a member of the French group Gold, Hernandez was signed by producer Jean Vanloo and left to Waterloo, Belgium to begin work on a solo album. In November, 1978, the album was released on the Aariana sub-label Aquarius Records (in France). The first single released from the album was "Born to Be Alive". It found immediate success throughout Europe, and in January 1979, Hernandez received his first gold record from Italy. Just starting her career as a dancer, Madonna toured parts of Europe with Hernandez.

In early 1979, the album reached the US market with a release on the A-Tom-Mik label and later Columbia Records. The US release contained a remixed version of "Born to Be Alive" and found great success, peaking in the US Billboard Hot Dance Club Play chart at #1 and on the Billboard Hot 100 at #16. It sold over one million copies in the US.

== Track listing ==
Side one
No.	Title	Length
1.	"Disco Queen"	6:04
2.	"You Turn Me On"	4:37
3.	"Show Me The Way You Kiss"	7:20

Side two
No.	Title	Length
1.	"Back to Boogie"	5:04
2.	"It Comes So Easy"	2:28
3.	"Born To Be Alive (New Mix)"	6:05
4.	"I Give You a Rendez-Vous (New Mix)"	3:27
Total length:		35:05

== Charts ==
=== Weekly charts ===
Chart (1979)	Peak position
Australia (Kent Music Report)	1
German Albums (Offizielle Top 100)	20
Norwegian Albums (VG-lista)	9
Swedish Albums (Sverigetopplistan)	1
US Billboard 200	61
US Top R&B/Hip-Hop Albums (Billboard)	53

=== Year-end charts ===
Chart (1979)	Peak position
Australia (Kent Music Report)	5
