= Born to Be Alive (song) =

1979 disco song by Patrick Hernandez

- French 12-inch vinyl single

Single by Patrick Hernandez

from the album Born to Be Alive
- B-side: "I Give You Rendez-Vous" (UK) "Born to Be Alive (Instrumental)" (various European countries) "It Comes So Easy" (Japan) "Too Many People" (elsewhere)
- Released: November 1978
- Recorded: 1978
- Genre: Disco
- Length: 3:05 (European single version); 3:23 (single version); 5:55 (album version); 7:28 (extended version)
- Label: Aquarius (most European countries); Gem (UK); Philips (Japan); Columbia/CBS (elsewhere)
- Songwriter: Patrick Hernandez
- Producer: Jean Vanloo

Music video
- "Born to Be Alive" (single version) on YouTube

Audio
- "Born to Be Alive" (album version) on YouTube

"Born to Be Alive" is a song written by French singer Patrick Hernandez. It became a worldwide hit and reached number one on the U.S. Billboard National Disco Action chart in early 1979. The song achieved gold status in the United States, Brazil, Germany and Italy, platinum in Australia and Canada, and silver in the United Kingdom.

== Charts ==
=== Weekly charts ===
==== Original version ====
Chart (1979)	Peak position
Australia (Kent Music Report)	1
Austria (Ö3 Austria Top 40)	1
Belgium (Ultratop 50 Flanders)	2
Canada (CRIA)	1
Canada Adult Contemporary (RPM)	10
Canada Dance/Urban (RPM)	1
Canada Top Singles (RPM)	1
Denmark (IFPI)	1
Finland	5
France (IFOP)	1
Ireland (IRMA)	21
Italy (Musica e dischi)	1
Mexico	1
Netherlands (Dutch Top 40)	5
Netherlands (Single Top 100)	12
New Zealand (Recorded Music NZ)	1
Norway (VG-lista)	1
Portugal	1
South Africa (Springbok Radio)	6
Spain (AFE)	1
Sweden (Sverigetopplistan)	1
Switzerland (Schweizer Hitparade)	5
UK Singles (Official Charts)	10
US Billboard Hot 100	16
US Billboard National Disco Action	1
US Cash Box	17
US Record World	19
West Germany (GfK)	1

==== Born to Be Alive (re-mix '88) ====
Chart (1988)	Peak position
Netherlands (Dutch Top 40)	21
Netherlands (Single Top 100)	20

=== Year-end charts ===
Chart (1979)	Rank
Australia (Kent Music Report)	5
Austria (Ö3 Austria Top 40)	2
Belgium (Ultratop 50 Flanders)	4
Canada Top Singles (RPM)	29
France (IFOP)	1
Netherlands (Dutch Top 40)	18
Netherlands (Single Top 100)	33
US Billboard Hot 100	70
US Top Audience Response Singles/LPs	7
West Germany (Official German Charts)	2

== Certifications and sales ==
Region	Certification	Certified units/sales
Australia (ARIA)	Platinum	100,000^{^}
Brazil (Pro-Música Brasil)	Gold	200,000
Canada (Music Canada)	Platinum	150,000^{^}
France	—	1,400,000
Germany (BVMI)	Gold	950,000
Italy	—	300,000
Italy (FIMI) sales since 2009	Gold	50,000^{‡}
Netherlands	—	100,000
New Zealand (RMNZ)	Gold	15,000^{‡}
Spain (Promusicae)	Gold	30,000^{‡}
United Kingdom (BPI)	Silver	250,000^{^}
United States (RIAA)	Gold	1,000,000^{^}
^{^} Shipments figures based on certification alone.^{‡} Sales+streaming figures based on certification alone.

== Cover versions and uses ==
Rick Summer released a cover in 1979 which peaked at No. 71 on the Billboard Dance chart in August of that year.

Kelly Marie released a Hi-NRG interpretation of the song in 1986 but it failed to chart.

Disco Kings covered the song in 2005. Their version reached number seven in Finland, number 43 in France, number 66 in Austria and number 78 in Germany. A music video set to the song using footage from Adolf Hitler's many rallies and speeches became a viral hit on the Internet.

The song is featured on the intro of "Hockey Brings People Together" of the first season of the television series Shoresy during the warm-up brawl in the Bulldogs' tunnel.

Elisapie featured an Inuktitut language translation of the song, "Inuuniaravit," on her 2023 album Inuktitut.

The song is featured on an Amyl and the Sniffers 7" single from 2020.

Hernandez's "Reborn Version" is featured on Just Dance 2026 Edition.

== See also ==
- List of best-selling singles in France
- List of number-one singles in Australia during the 1970s
- List of number-one singles of 1979 (Canada)
- List of number-one singles of 1979 (France)
- List of number-one hits of 1979 (Germany)
- List of number-one hits (Italy)
- List of number-one hits of 1979 (Mexico)
- List of number-one singles in 1979 (New Zealand)
- List of number-one songs in Norway
- List of RPM number-one dance singles of 1979
- List of number-one singles of 1979 (Spain)
- List of number-one singles and albums in Sweden
- List of number-one dance singles of 1979 (U.S.)
