= Amar Sin Mentiras =

Studio album by Marc Anthony
- Released: June 8, 2004
- Recorded: 2003–2004
- Studios: Midnight Blue Studios (Miami, FL)
- Genres: Latin pop; pop rock; soft rock; latin ballad
- Length: 43:16
- Labels: Sony Discos; Columbia
- Producer: Estéfano

Marc Anthony chronology
Mended (2002)	Amar Sin Mentiras (2004)	Valió la Pena (2004)

Singles from Amar Sin Mentiras
- 1. "¿Ahora Quién?" Released: April 12, 2004; 2. "Valió la Pena" Released: June 28, 2004; 3. "Tan Sólo Palabras" Released: September 27, 2004; 4. "Se Esfuma Tu Amor" Released: December 27, 2004; 5. "Amigo" Released: May 9, 2005; 6. "Tu Amor Me Hace Bien" Released: September 12, 2005; 7. "Volando Entre Tus Brazos" Released: February 27, 2006

Professional ratings
Review scores
Source	Rating
Allmusic	5/5 stars

Amar Sin Mentiras (English: Love Without Lies) is the seventh studio album and fifth Spanish language album recorded by Puerto Rican-American singer-songwriter Marc Anthony. It was released by Sony Discos and Columbia Records on June 8, 2004 (see 2004 in music). The album was produced by Colombian singer-songwriter Estéfano. It is his first pop album in Spanish. It also features the vocals of Jennifer López. It won Grammy Award for Best Latin Pop Album at 47th Annual Grammy Awards on February 13, 2005. The lead single from album's "¿Ahora Quién?" reached No. 1 on Hot Latin Tracks in 2004.

== Track listing ==
"¿Ahora Quién?" (2004)
Sample of the first single "¿Ahora Quién?".

"Valió la Pena" (2004)
Sample of "Valió la Pena", whose salsa version was released as single.

No.	Title	Writer(s)	Length
1.	"¿Ahora Quién?"	Estéfano; Julio C. Reyes	5:05
2.	"Escapémonos" (with Jennifer López)	Estéfano; Julio C. Reyes	4:45
3.	"Se Esfuma Tu Amor"	Estéfano; José Luis Pagán	3:52
4.	"Valió la Pena"	Marc Anthony; Estéfano	3:42
5.	"Tu Amor Me Hace Bien"	Estéfano	4:36
6.	"Tan Sólo Palabras"	Estéfano; Julio C. Reyes	3:42
7.	"Volando Entre Tus Brazos"	Estéfano; Julio C. Reyes	4:25
8.	"Nada Personal"	Marc Anthony; Estéfano; Julio C. Reyes	4:38
9.	"Amigo"	Erasmo Carlos; Roberto Carlos	3:41
10.	"Amar Sin Mentiras"	Estéfano; Julio C. Reyes	4:50
Total length:			43:16

== Credits and personnel ==
=== Personnel ===
- Mauricio Gasca – arranger, programmer and recording engineer
- Andrew Synowieck – electric guitar
- Julio C. Reyes – piano
- Guillermo Vadala – bass guitar
- Daniel Ávila – drums
- Juan José "Chaqueno" Martinez, Eduardo Avena – percussion
- Óscar Chino Asencio – Acoustic and electric guitar
- Álex Batista, Claudio Ledda, Diana Pereyra, Ana Karfi, Dorita, Chávez, Vicky Echeverri, Jose Luis Pagán – background vocals .

== Charts ==
Chart (2004)	Peak position
Dominican Republic Albums Chart	7
Spanish Albums Chart	18
Swiss Albums (Schweizer Hitparade)	37
U.S. Billboard 200	26
U.S. Billboard Top Latin Albums	1
U.S. Billboard Latin Pop Albums	1

== Certifications and sales ==
Region	Certification	Certified units/sales
Argentina (CAPIF)	Gold	20,000^{^}
Mexico (AMPROFON)	Platinum	100,000^{^}
Spain (Promusicae)	Platinum	150,000
United States (RIAA)	2× Platinum (Latin)	200,000^{^}
^{^} Shipments figures based on certification alone.
