= I Need You (Marc Anthony song) =

Single by Marc Anthony

from the album Mended
- Released: April 6, 2002
- Recorded: 2001
- Genre: Pop
- Length: 4:11
- Songwriter(s): Cory Rooney

Marc Anthony singles chronology
"Hasta Que Vuelvas Conmigo" (2002)	"I Need You" (2002)	"I've Got You" (2002)

Music video
- "I Need You" on YouTube

"I Need You" is a single by Marc Anthony that appears also on his album Mended. It was released as a double A-side alongside "Me Haces Falta".

"I Need You" was written by Cory Rooney. The single was released on April 6, 2002, as the debut single from the album.

== Music video ==
Music video is built around Marc Anthony chasing his love interest in a car driving and car racing context. The actress in the video is Ivana Miličević.

== Charts ==
The song reached No. 22 in Sverigetopplistan, the official Swedish Singles Chart. It also appeared in Swiss Singles Chart.

=== Weekly charts ===
Chart (2002)	Peak position
Canadian Singles Chart	22
Canada Radio (Nielsen BDS)	14
Canada AC (Nielsen BDS)	2
Sweden (Sverigetopplistan)	22
Switzerland (Schweizer Hitparade)	53
US Adult Contemporary (Billboard)	4
US Latin Pop Airplay (Billboard) Spanish version: "Me Haces Falta"	27

=== Year-end charts ===
Chart (2002)	Position
US Adult Contemporary (Billboard)	11
