= My Baby You =

Single by Marc Anthony

from the album Marc Anthony
- Released: August 11, 2000
- Genre: Latin pop
- Length: 3:49
- Label: Columbia
- Songwriter(s): Marc Anthony, Walter Afanasieff
- Producer(s): Marc Anthony, Walter Afanasieff

Marc Anthony singles chronology
"You Sang to Me/Muy Dentro de Mí" (2000)	"My Baby You" (2000)	"When I Dream at Night" (2000)

"My Baby You" is a song written and performed by Marc Anthony, and was released as the fourth single of his first English-language album Marc Anthony.

== Song information ==
The song was written and produced by Marc Anthony and Walter Afanasieff, and was the first single from the album Marc Anthony without a Spanish version and was dedicated to his daughter, Arianna. The single was less successful than the previous singles from the performer, peaking low at number 70 in the Billboard Hot 100 chart. Because no physical single was released, the track was charting airplay only.

Daniel Evans, a finalist on season 5 of The X Factor also released a version on his debut album, No Easy Way, also dedicating it to his daughter, Ana, whose mother died shortly after giving birth.

== Chart performance ==
The single entered the Billboard Hot 100 chart at number 82 in the week of September 16, 2000, climbing to its peak position (number 70) in the week of October 7, 2000.

== Charts ==
=== Weekly charts ===
Chart (2000–2001)	Peak position
US Billboard Hot 100	70
US Adult Contemporary (Billboard)	7
US Hot Latin Songs (Billboard)	19
US Latin Pop Airplay (Billboard)	16
US Tropical Airplay (Billboard)	7

=== Year-end charts ===
Chart (2001)	Position
US Adult Contemporary (Billboard)	20
