= Valió la Pena =

Studio album by Marc Anthony
- Released: July 27, 2004
- Recorded: 2004
- Studio: Record One, Los Angeles, California; Ocean Way, Los Angeles, California; Sound on Sound Studios, New York, New York
- Genre: Salsa; tropical
- Label: Sony BMG Norte; Columbia
- Producer: Sergio George

Marc Anthony chronology
Amar Sin Mentiras (2004)	Valió la Pena (2004)	Sigo Siendo Yo: Grandes Éxitos (2006)

Singles from Valió la Pena
- 1. "Valió la Pena" Released: March 8, 2004; 2. "Volando Entre Tus Brazos" Released: September 6, 2004

Professional ratings
Review scores
Source	Rating
Allmusic	4.5/5 stars

Valió la Pena ("It was Worth it") is the sixth Spanish album and eighth studio album by Marc Anthony. Anthony is reunited with Producer Sergio George on their first collaborative work since 1995's Todo A Su Tiempo album.

The album contains seven songs from Anthony's previous album, Amar Sin Mentiras, in a salsa arrangement and adds Rafael Hernández's classic "Lamento Borincano." Like the previous album, Valió la Pena also peaked #1 at Top Latin Albums. The album was awarded Best Salsa Album at the 2005 Latin Grammy Awards and "Tropical Album of the Year" at the Premio Lo Nuestro 2005 awards.

== Track listing ==
1. Valió la Pena
2. Escapémonos (duet with Jennifer Lopez)
3. Ahora Quien
4. Tu Amor Me Hace Bien
5. Volando Entre Tus Brazos
6. Amigo
7. Se Esfuma Tu Amor
8. Lamento Borincano

== Charts ==
=== Weekly charts ===
Chart (2004)	Peak position
Dominican Albums	1
Spanish Albums	7
U.S. Billboard 200	122
U.S. Billboard Top Latin Albums	1
U.S. Billboard Tropical Albums	1

=== Year-end charts ===
Chart (2004)	Position
Dominican Albums (Musicalia)	1
US Top Latin Albums (Billboard)	33
US Tropical Albums (Billboard)	4

== Sales and certifications ==
Region	Certification	Certified units/sales
Spain (PROMUSICAE)	Gold	50,000^{^}
United States (RIAA)	2× Platinum (Latin)	200,000^{^}
^{^} Shipments figures based on certification alone.

== See also ==
- List of number-one Billboard Top Latin Albums of 2004
- List of number-one Billboard Tropical Albums from the 2000s
