= Amigo (Roberto Carlos song) =

1977 single by Roberto Carlos

Single by Roberto Carlos

from the album Roberto Carlos
- Language: Portuguese (original); Spanish
- B-side: "No te olvides de mi"
- Released: 1977
- Genre: Latin pop
- Length: 3:31
- Label: CBS Records
- Songwriters: Erasmo Carlos, Roberto Carlos; Buddy & Mary McCluskey (Spanish adaptation)

"Amigo" (English: "Friend") is a popular song written by Brazilian songwriters Erasmo Carlos and Roberto Carlos and originally recorded by the latter in Portuguese in 1977. As with many other of his songs, Roberto Carlos also recorded a Spanish-language version, with lyrics by Buddy and Mary McCluskey. The song, which praises a friendship that has overcome many difficulties, became particularly popular after a children's choir sang it for Pope John Paul II on his 1979 visit to Mexico.

== Background and release ==
Roberto Carlos dedicated Amigo to his longtime songwriting partner, Erasmo Carlos. As with many of their other songs, Erasmo wrote the music and Roberto wrote the lyrics of the song. In the lyrics, Roberto Carlos praises his friend for having been by his side through many journeys and difficulties and describes him as "a man with the heart of a child" whose "heart is a house with open doors".

By this time, Roberto Carlos was already a very important figure in Latin music, and it had become usual for him to record Spanish-language versions of his songs so that they could be popular in the rest of Latin America. On this occasion, Argentine siblings Buddy and Mary McCluskey wrote the Spanish lyrics, which are mostly identical in meaning to the original Portuguese lyrics, and thus the song was released in Spanish with No te olvides de mi as the B-side.

The song became popular through Latin America, and particularly in Mexico, where it first charted in early 1978 until reaching #1 in the charts on the 10 March 1978 week.

== Amigo and Pope John Paul II's 1979 visit to Mexico ==
A year later, Pope John Paul II was to visit Mexico from 26 January until 1 February 1979; the event was of special importance, since it was the first time ever that a Pope would visit the country. On 30 January, the Pope was scheduled to visit the Instituto Miguel Ángel, a private Catholic school, where the Children's Rondalla of the Colegio México (Rondalla Infantil del Colegio México) and the Estudiantina of the Miguel Ángel Institute (Estudiantina del Instituto Miguel Ángel) would sing three songs for the Pope; two of those songs would be Tú eres Pedro (a hymn composed by Alejandro Mejía) and Himno a la alegría, but the organizers couldn't decide on the third song. After having rehearsed many songs with the children, with only a few days remaining before the Pope's scheduled visit and with the organizers still unable to decide which should be the third song, one of the child singers, tired from the many rehearsals, shouted from the back: "Why don't we sing Amigo? The Pope says that us children are his friends". The child's proposal was accepted and thus the Roberto Carlos song was chosen as the third song.

On January 30, the Pope visited the Institute, and the children sang the three songs as scheduled; the event was highly publicized and after it became known that Amigo had been one of the songs that the children sang for the Pope, public interest in the song resurged and radio stations began playing the song again. Shortly after, Musart Records released a studio recording of the song performed by the Children's Rondalla of the Colegio México and the Children's Estudiantina of the Instituto Miguel Ángel with the tagline "The children who sang for His Holiness John Paul II", featuring a photograph of the Pope on the record cover.

This helped Roberto Carlos' original version to find commercial success once more and to return to the Mexican charts, eventually reaching #1 once again for two weeks beginning on 30 March 1979, a little over a year since it had first done so. The recording by the child singers, which has a slower tempo than the Roberto Carlos version and features an accordion accompaniment, was successful too. Roberto Carlos later stated his appreciation at his song having been performed for the Pope, adding: "I am religious, I am Catholic, I like messages".

== Chart performance ==
Weekly chart (1978)	Peak position
Mexico (Radio Mil)	1

Weekly chart (1979)	Peak position
Mexico (Radio Mil)	1

== In film ==
The event was recreated in the 1980 movie "Amigo", starring child actor and singer Pedro Fernández, where at the end of the film Fernández' character is shown as being part of the children's choir who sang Amigo for Pope John Paul II; the movie shots are intertwined with actual footage from the Pope's visit to the Basilica of Our Lady of Guadalupe.

== Marc Anthony version ==
"Amigo"

Song by Marc Anthony

from the album Amar Sin Mentiras and Valió la Pena
- Released: 2005
- Genre: Pop (ballad version)/Salsa music
- Length: 3:42 (ballad version) • 4:13 (salsa version)
- Label: Sony Discos
- Songwriters: Erasmo Carlos, Roberto Carlos; Buddy & Mary McCluskey (Spanish adaptation)
- Producers: Marc Anthony (both versions); Estéfano (ballad version); Sergio George (salsa version)

Marc Anthony singles chronology
"Se Esfuma Tu Amor" (2005)	"Amigo" (2005)	"Tu Amor Me Hace Bien" (2005)

In 2004, American singer Marc Anthony covered "Amigo" on his studio albums, Amar Sin Mentiras (2004) and Valió la Pena (2004) as a ballad and salsa version, respectively. The salsa version was praised by The Province's Stuart Derdeyn as "tasty" with its "multiple horn lines". The salsa version peaked at number four on the Billboard Tropical Airplay chart. Anthony performed the song live with Chayanne and Alejandro Fernández.

== See also ==
- List of number-one hits of 1978 (Mexico)
- List of number-one hits of 1979 (Mexico)
- 1970s in Latin music
