= You Sang to Me =

2000 single by Marc Anthony

Single by Marc Anthony

from the album Marc Anthony
- Released: February 7, 2000
- Genre: Pop
- Length: 5:48 (album version); 3:51 (radio edit)
- Label: Columbia
- Songwriters: Marc Anthony; Cory Rooney
- Producers: Anthony; Rooney

Marc Anthony singles chronology
"I Need to Know" (1999)	"You Sang to Me" (2000)	"My Baby You" (2000)

Music video
- "You Sang to Me" on YouTube

"You Sang to Me" is a song recorded by American singer Marc Anthony for his self-titled fourth studio album (1999). Cory Rooney produced the recording and co-wrote the song with Anthony. "You Sang to Me" is a mid-tempo, pop and romantic ballad that includes elements of Latin, R&B, and adult contemporary genres whose lyrics are about a man who lets his life partner walk away although he is in a relationship with another person. Anthony also recorded a Spanish-language version of the song titled "Muy Dentro de Mí", which has additional lyrical contributions by Roberto Blades and Gaitanes.

Music critics gave "You Sang to Me" a positive reception upon its release, praising Anthony's vocals and the song's arrangements. Anthony received several accolades, including a Grammy nomination for Best Male Pop Vocal Performance in 2001. The song reached number one on the American and Canadian adult contemporary charts, and the top 10 of the Billboard Hot 100 in the United States. It also peaked within the top 10 in Austria, Belgium (Flanders region), the Netherlands, New Zealand, and Norway. It was certified gold in Austria, Norway, and Sweden. "Muy Dentro de Mí" topped the US Billboard Hot Latin Tracks and Tropical/Salsa Tracks charts.

Anthony included the song on the set lists of his 1999 promotional tour, Marc Anthony 2002 Tour, and El Cantante Tour (2007–08). Jeff Richter directed the music video for "You Sang to Me", which was filmed in New York City, features Australian model Kristy Hinze, and portrays Anthony as a painter who falls in love with his assistant.

== Background ==
In 1996, RMM executive Ralph Mercado mentioned the possibility of Marc Anthony recording an English-language album following a joint-venture between MCA Records and RMM, Anthony's label at the time. Anthony said he would not record in English until he felt he was ready to do so. After the release of his third studio album Contra la Corriente in 1997, disputes over business practices between him and Mercado arose when a check Anthony wrote for his daughter bounced. Anthony hired his brother Bigram Zayas to investigate Mercado's business dealings. Mercado would not allow Anthony to leave RMM because his contract committed Anthony to record four more albums for the label.

Columbia Records executive Tommy Mottola had approached Anthony to sign a contract to record an album during the peak period of Latin artists crossing over to the Anglophone market. Anthony's contract with RMM, however, denied him the right to record in Spanish for Columbia Records. This situation resulted in a lawsuit against Mercado because Anthony did not want to work under him anymore. As part of the settlement, RMM Records retained the rights to Anthony's earlier albums and to release a compilation album from them while Anthony no longer had any obligations to RMM.

After being signed to Columbia Records, Mottola hired Cory Rooney, Rodney Jerkins, and Walter Afanasieff to produce Anthony's next album. Anthony's next album. Anthony, along with his associates, co-wrote most of the tracks on the album. Anthony described his eponymous disc as the "most personal album by far", and refuted the idea he was another Latin artist to crossing over to the Anglophone market because he had already recorded the English-language album, When the Night is Over (1991). One of the songs Anthony wrote with Rooney is "You Sang to Me", which according to the artist, was the first track he composed for the album. Rooney also handled the song's production.

== Music and lyrics ==
"You Sang to Me" is a mid-tempo, pop ballad that includes elements of Latin, R&B, and adult contemporary genres. Anthony's vocals are accompanied by acoustic guitars and keyboards, and an accordion solo. According to Celia Fernandez of O, The Oprah Magazine, the song tells "the story of a man not realizing he had let the love of his life walk away while still being with someone else". In an interview with Jam!, Anthony described the process of composing the song:

I remember writing the track with Cory Rooney, and going home, I came up with the melody. Then I said, 'What am I going to sing about? What does the melody scream out?' It's screaming out a positive story, an experience with a loved one. After that first hurdle, it all just poured out. It's almost like a barrel of wine that's been sitting there for 10 years and you make a crack and it just pours out. It was in there all along. Everything I wrote was heartfelt. There was no bull about it. It wasn't a trend thing. I just closed my eyes for those two months and just let it pour out.

In the song, Anthony chants, "Just to think you live inside of me/I had no idea how this could be/Now I'm crazy for your love". In 2007, Anthony said the song was inspired by his emotions for American entertainer Jennifer Lopez. The duo married in 2004 and divorced ten years later. Lopez referenced "You Sang to Me" in her song "One Love" following their separation, singing, "You sang to me, but I’m not sure". Anthony also recorded a Spanish-language version of the song titled "Muy Dentro de Mi", which includes additional lyrical contributions from Roberto Blades, and Ricardo and Alberto Gaitán.

== Release and promotion ==
Columbia Records released "You Sang to Me" as the second single from Marc Anthony in 2000. The song was first released on the soundtrack for Runaway Bride, prior to the release of Marc Anthony. It was serviced to adult contemporary, hot adult contemporary, and rhythmic contemporary radio on February 7 and 8, 2000. In Europe, on April 25, 2000, it was issued as a CD single containing remixes of the song. "Muy Dentro de Mi" was later included on Anthony's compilation album Sigo Siendo Yo: Grandes Éxitos (2006).

Jeff Richter directed the accompanying music video for "You Sang to Me", which was filmed in New York City. In the video, Anthony is portrayed as a painter and becomes enamored with his assistant, played by Australian model Kristy Hinze. Anthony and Hinze are depicted shopping, ice-skating in Prospect Park, Brooklyn, and dining together. When Anthony proposes to Hinze, she runs away. In the end, Anthony is alone at an art exhibition when Hinze appears behind him, and they rekindle their love. According to the New York Daily News editors George Rush and Joanna Molly, "Anthony has a guardian angel who appears in the form of a homeless man" and is portrayed by Felipe Muniz, the singer's father.

Anthony performed "You Sang to Me" on the promotional tour for Marc Anthony. He performed the song at Madison Square Garden as an encore; this performance is included on the video album The Concert from Madison Square Garden. "You Sang to Me" was included on set lists of Anthony's 2002 tour, and his and Lopez's El Cantante Tour (2007–2008).

== Critical reception ==
Following its release, "You Sang to Me" was met with positive reactions from music critics, praising Anthony's vocals and the song's arrangements. Billboard editor Chuck Taylor called "You Sang to Me" a "stunningly beautiful track" and said the song "will not only feed the souls of those in love but remind those who are wishing to find it again what it ideally feels like". Taylor also wrote, "unlike many songs of devotion, Anthony's lyrics truly makes you perk up your ears and consider every line; it's as if you can envision Anthony sitting in a hotel room writing each verse, as he pines for his own love". The Village Voice writer Grace Bastidas noted both "You Sang to Me" and "That's Okay" "show off his range the best". Richard Harrington of The Washington Post stated Anthony summons the "exhilaration of infatuation" on the song. Jon Bream, writing for Star Tribune, said the song has a "strong melody and a big ending". Reviewing the soundtrack of Runaway Bride, Houston Chronicle's Bruce Westbrook called "You Sang to Me" the "best of ballads", and complimented its "potent hooks and harmonies".

Baltimore Sun writer JD Considine complimented Anthony for being able to "pull every bit of emotion from a lyric" on "You Sang to Me". Ed Morales, also of The Village Voice, commented Anthony's "well-rehearsed and intoxicating voice" turns "When I Dream at Night" and "You Sang to Me" into "unexpectedly emotional experiences". Los Angeles Times critic Ernesto Lechner praised the track's "serene" keyboards. The Morning Call editor Paul Willistein said "You Sang to Me" is "another sweet midtempo offering" on the album. In an unfavorable review of the film's soundtrack, Jennifer Barrs of the Tampa Tribune was more critical of the track and panned Anthony for singing only three notes in the song.

== Accolades ==
In 2020, Billboard ranked "You Sang to Me" as the 68th-best song of 2000. Celia Fernandez of the Daily Oprah listed it as the fifth-best song by Marc Anthony. Listing only his English-language songs, Classic Rock History writer Michele Johnson ranked it as Anthony's fifth-best song. Chaospin contributor Linda Giantino placed "You Sang to Me" as the best song by Anthony.

At the 43rd Annual Grammy Awards in 2001, "You Sang to Me" received a nomination for Male Pop Vocal Performance, which ultimately went to "She Walks This Earth" by Sting. At the 7th Blockbuster Entertainment Awards in the same year, "You Sang to Me" was nominated in the category of Favorite Song From a Movie but the award went to "Can't Fight the Moonlight" by LeAnn Rimes. At the 13th Annual Lo Nuestro Awards in 2001, "Muy Dentro de Mi" was nominated for Pop Song of the Year but lost to "A Puro Dolor" by Son by Four. At the 8th Annual Latin Billboard Music Awards in 2001, "Muy Dentro de Mi" received four nominations in the categories Hot Latin Song of the Year, Latin Pop Song of the Year, Tropical/Salsa Track of the Year, and Latin Dance Maxi-Single of the Year'; it lost the first three to "A Puro Dolor" and the latter to Enrique Iglesias' "Sólo Me Importas Tú". Anthony and Rooney received an American Society of Composers, Authors and Publishers (ASCAP) Pop Award for "You Sang to Me"'s commercial success in 2002. "Muy Dentro De Mi" was also awarded in the Pop field at the 2001 ASCAP Latin Awards. Both versions received a Broadcast Music, Inc. Award in their respective fields.

== Chart performance ==
On the US Billboard Hot 100, "You Sang to Me" debuted at number 77 on the chart dated February 26, 2000. The song rose up the chart over the next four months, peaking at number two on June 3, 2000 and giving Anthony both his highest position on the Hot 100 and his final top 10 hit on the chart. The song topped the Adult Contemporary chart for seven weeks and peaked on the Billboard Adult Top 40, Mainstream Top 40, and Rhythmic Top 40 charts at numbers 18, 15, and 27, respectively. "Muy Dentro de Mi" topped the Hot Latin Tracks and Tropical/Salsa Tracks charts, becoming Anthony's fourth and thirteenth number-one song on those charts. The Spanish version also peaked at number two on the Latin Pop Tracks chart. In Canada, "You Sang to Me" peaked at number 11 and topped the adult contemporary chart according to RPM.

"You Sang to Me" failed to chart in Australia, but reached number ten in New Zealand. In mainland Europe, the song reached the top 10 in Austria, Belgium (Flanders region), the Netherlands—both the Dutch Top 40 and the Dutch Single Top 100— and Norway. It also peaked at number 11 in Sweden, at number 15 in Finland, and at number 21 in Germany and Switzerland. "You Sang to Me" was named Europe's 76th-best-performing song of 2000 by Music & Media magazine and was certified gold in Austria, Norway, and Sweden.

== Track listings ==
CD maxi-single

1. "You Sang to Me" (radio edit) – 3:51
2. "You Sang to Me" (remix) – 5:30
3. "Muy Dentro de Mi" (radio edit #2) – 3:49
4. "I Need to Know" (Pablo Flores Miami Mix) – 10:50

== Credits and personnel ==
Credits adapted from the Marc Anthony and Sigo Siendo Yo: Grandes Exitos liner notes.

- Marc Anthony – vocals, songwriting
- Cory Rooney – co-production, keyboards, programming, songwriting
- Mick Guzauski – mixing
- Robb Williams – engineering
- David Swope – assistant engineering
- Tom Bender – assistant engineering
- T-Bone Wolk – bass, accordion, vibraslap
- Roberto Blades – songwriting ("Muy Dentro de Mi")
- Ricardo Gaitán – songwriting ("Muy Dentro de Mi")
- Alberto Gaitán – songwriting ("Muy Dentro de Mi")

== Charts ==
=== Weekly charts ===
Weekly chart performance for "You Sang to Me"
Chart (2000)	Peak position
Austria (Ö3 Austria Top 40)	3
Belgium (Ultratop 50 Flanders)	6
Canada Top Singles (RPM)	11
Canada Adult Contemporary (RPM)	1
Croatia International Airplay (HRT)	1
Finland (Suomen virallinen lista)	15
Germany (GfK)	21
Netherlands (Dutch Top 40)	3
Netherlands (Single Top 100)	2
New Zealand (Recorded Music NZ)	10
Norway (VG-lista)	3
Sweden (Sverigetopplistan)	11
Switzerland (Schweizer Hitparade)	21
US Billboard Hot 100	2
US Adult Contemporary (Billboard)	1
US Adult Pop Airplay (Billboard)	18
US Pop Airplay (Billboard)	15
US Rhythmic Airplay (Billboard)	27

Weekly chart performance for "Muy Dentro de Mi"
Chart (2000)	Peak position
US Hot Latin Songs (Billboard)	1
US Latin Pop Airplay (Billboard)	2
US Tropical Airplay (Billboard)	1

=== Year-end charts ===
2000 year-end chart performance for "You Sang to Me"
Chart (2000)	Position
Austria (Ö3 Austria Top 40)	23
Belgium (Ultratop 50 Flanders)	19
Europe (Eurochart Hot 100)	76
Germany (Media Control GfK)	87
Netherlands (Mega Top 100)	7
Switzerland (Schweizer Hitparade)	91
US Billboard Hot 100	23
US Adult Contemporary (Billboard)	5

2001 year-end chart performance for "You Sang to Me"
Chart (2001)	Position
US Adult Contemporary (Billboard)	27

2000 year-end chart performance for "Muy Dentro de Mi"
Chart (2000)	Position
US Hot Latin Tracks (Billboard)	6
US Latin Pop Tracks (Billboard)	5
US Tropical/Salsa Tracks (Billboard)	5

== Certifications ==
Region	Certification	Certified units/sales
Austria (IFPI Austria)	Gold	25,000^{*}
Norway (IFPI Norway)	Gold	5,000^{*}
Sweden (GLF)	Gold	15,000^{^}
^{*} Sales figures based on certification alone.^{^} Shipments figures based on certification alone.

== See also ==
- List of Billboard Adult Contemporary number ones of 2000
- List of number-one Billboard Hot Latin Tracks of 2000
- List of Billboard Tropical Airplay number ones of 2000
