= Cherry Laine =

Jamaican-born singer

- Born: Florence Evadne; January 4, 1943 (age 83); Juno Pen, St. Mary, Jamaica
- Origin: Frankfurt, West Germany
- Genres: Disco
- Occupation: Musician
- Instrument: Singing
- Labels: CBS, Black Label, Skylight, Sunshine
- Spouse: Karl Heinz Merkel

Florence Evadne (born January 4, 1943), known professionally as Cherry Laine, is a Jamaican-born singer based in Spain (and previously Germany), contracted to Bernt Moehrle, who worked with CBS Records. She is known for disco hits "A Night in Chicago" (1977), "The Sea-Fare Folk" (1979), and "Catch the Cat" (1978) — which was number one in Spain and reached Gold. She issued one album, I'm Hot (CBS 83608), which was recorded at Europasound Studios with producer and composer Bernt Möhrle, known for creating a new standard of disco with his Chilly project, and producer of Le Angeli, Mabel and many more.

== Biography ==
Evadne was born in Juno Pen, St. Mary, Jamaica to a clergyman father, and mother who was a nurse. She began singing at age six at her local church. Her family later emigrated to the United Kingdom. Once her parents died, she moved to Frankfurt, West Germany, changed her stage name, and pursued her dreams of becoming a professional singer. In 1977, she performed at the Frankfurt discotheque, Dorian Gray, where Bernt Möhrle discovered her. Möhrle offered her an opportunity to create the solo project, Cherry Laine, with Bernt Moehrle as producer and composer. After two singles "Everybody Knows It" and "A Night in Chicago", Chery Laine had her first international hit with "Catch The Cat", which became No. 1 in Austria and Spain — where it became a double gold record. Among her other songs that were hits during the disco era around the world include "Speed Freak Sam" (1979) and "Danny's Disco" (1979). Cherry Laine would go on to work with Bernt Moehrle for many years in the studio and also as a chorus and background singer.

In 1981, she represented Germany and won the Viña del Mar International Song Festival in Chile with the song "Waiting". Her other singles, including "Catch The Cat" further had intense airplay and record sales in South America. The song even peaked at number 100 in Australia in December 1978.

In the mid-1980s, Laine moved to Spain where she still lives today with her husband and composer, Karl Heinz Merkel. Here she continued her music career and released 3 further albums.

Since 2019, Laine has a contract with Sunshine Records and released the album "Black and White" in March of that year.

== Discography ==
=== Albums ===
Title	Year
I'm Hot	1979
Love What Is Love (Mini-album)	2006
Who says	2015
Boy Toy	2016
Cats	2017
Black and White	2019

=== Singles and EPs ===
Title	Year
"Everybody Knows It"	1977
"A Night in Chicago"	1977
"Catch the Cat"	1978
"The Sea-Fare Folk (Hey-Ho and Up She Rises)"	1979
"Danny's Disco"	1979
"Cherry Laine = チェリー・レイン* - Speed Freak Sam / Love Is All We Need"	1979
"No More Monday"	1980
"I'm Losing You"	1980
"Waiting"	1981
"Tragedy"	1982
"My Guy"	1983
"The One Forever" / "Caution Danger"	1983
"Ninja Boys"	1985
"Jungle Lover Boy"	1986
"Freckless" / "Land of No Return"	1986
"A Night in Chicago" (Golden-Dance-Classics Re-issue)	1993
"Catch the Cat" (Cherry Laine Mix 2005)	2005
