= Mended =

Studio album by Marc Anthony
- Released: May 21, 2002
- Recorded: 2001–02
- Genre: Pop; Latin; R&B
- Language: English; Spanish
- Label: Columbia; Sony Discos
- Producer: Marc Anthony; Dan Shea; Cory Rooney; Ric Wake

Marc Anthony chronology
Libre (2001)	Mended (2002)	Amar Sin Mentiras (2004)

Singles from Mended
- 1. "I Need You" Released: April 6, 2002; 2. "I've Got You" Released: June 17, 2002; 3. "Tragedy"; 4. "She Mends Me"

Professional ratings
Review scores
Source	Rating
Allmusic	3/5 stars
Rolling Stone	2.5/5 stars

Mended is the sixth overall solo studio album and second English studio album by American Latin pop singer-songwriter Marc Anthony, released on May 21, 2002 by Columbia Records and Sony Discos. It was re-released with two bonus tracks in 2003 as Mended: Bonus Tracks.

After going through several release date changes, Marc Anthony released his second English studio album, Mended in mid-2002, shortly after issuing Libre. Mended delivers more of Anthony's passionate, urgent songs of love and betrayal, destined for mass consumption. The album features the hit singles "I've Got You", the Spanish version "Te Tengo Aqui", "Love Won't Get Any Better," as well as the well-known single "Tragedy." Bruce Springsteen composed a song, "I'll Stand By You Always", for Marc Anthony but the song was omitted from the album for unknown reasons.

The album was certified Platinum by the CRIA in October 2002 for sales of 100,000 units. The album debut at number 3 on Billboard 200 and sold over 111,000 copies in the first week in the United States. It sold over 1.3 millions of copies worldwide.

== Track listing ==
1. "Love Won't Get Any Better" (Marc Anthony, Dan Shea, Kara DioGuardi, Cory Rooney) – 3:38
2. "She Mends Me" (Marc Anthony, Dan Shea, Kara DioGuardi, Cory Rooney) – 3:15
3. "I've Got You" (Kara DioGuardi, Cory Rooney) – 3:56
4. "I Need You" (Cory Rooney) – 4:11
5. "Tragedy" (Rob Thomas, Cory Rooney) – 4:04
6. "I Reach for You" (Marc Anthony, Dan Shea, Kara DioGuardi, Cory Rooney) – 3:28
7. "I Swear" (Marc Anthony, Kara DioGuardi, Cory Rooney, Steve Morales, David Siegel) – 3:46
8. "Don't Tell Me It's Love" (Marc Anthony, Dan Shea, Kara DioGuardi) – 3:34
9. "Do You Believe in Loneliness" (Marc Anthony, Dan Shea, Kara DioGuardi, Cory Rooney) – 4:04
10. "Give Me a Reason" (Dan Shea, Kara DioGuardi, Cory Rooney) – 3:15
11. "I Wanna Be Free" (Marc Anthony, Dan Shea, Kara DioGuardi) – 3:58
12. "Everything You Do" (Marc Anthony, Andrew Fromm, Keith Follese) – 3:23
13. "Te Tengo Aquí" ("I've Got You") (Alejandro Lerner, Kara DioGuardi, Cory Rooney, Gizelle D'Cole) – 3:59

=== Bonus tracks ===
14. "Me Haces Falta" ("I Need You") – 3:52
15. "Tragedia" ("Tragedy") – 3:45

== Personnel ==
- Marc Anthony – vocals
- Michael Thompson – acoustic & electric guitars
- Renne Toledo – acoustic & nylon string guitars
- Eric Kupper – guitar, keyboards, programming
- Chieli Minucci – guitar
- Andy Abad – guitar
- David Dominguez – guitar
- Juan A Gonzalez – piano, keyboards
- Cory Rooney – keyboards, programming, background vocals
- Dan Shea – keyboards, programming
- Marc Russell – bass
- Erben Perez – bass
- Bobby Allende – percussion
- Richie Jones – programming
- Wendy Pederson – background vocals
- Raul Midon – background vocals
- Shelen Thomas – background vocals

== Charts ==
=== Weekly charts ===
Weekly chart performance for Mended
Chart (2002)	Peak position
Australian Albums (ARIA)	84
Austrian Albums (Ö3 Austria)	20
Belgian Albums (Ultratop Flanders)	30
Canadian Albums (Billboard)	1
Dutch Albums (Album Top 100)	28
German Albums (Offizielle Top 100)	26
Hungarian Albums (MAHASZ)	32
New Zealand Albums (RMNZ)	44
Norwegian Albums (VG-lista)	4
Portuguese Albums (AFP)	11
Swedish Albums (Sverigetopplistan)	11
Swiss Albums (Schweizer Hitparade)	13
US Billboard 200	3

=== Year-end charts ===
Year-end chart performance for Mended
Chart (2002)	Position
Canadian Albums (Nielsen SoundScan)	60
Swedish Albums (Sverigetopplistan)	86
Swiss Albums (Schweizer Hitparade)	70
US Billboard 200	139

== Certifications ==
Certifications and sales for Mended
Region	Certification	Certified units/sales
Canada (Music Canada)	Platinum	100,000^{^}
Norway (IFPI Norway)	Gold	25,000^{*}
Portugal (AFP)	Gold	20,000^{^}
Spain (Promusicae)	Platinum	100,000^{^}
United States (RIAA)	Gold	500,000^{^}
^{*} Sales figures based on certification alone.^{^} Shipments figures based on certification alone.
