= Cory Rooney =

American songwriter and record producer

- Born: Mark Cory Rooney
- Origin: New York City, U.S.
- Genres: Hip hop; hip hop soul; new jack swing; R&B; Latin pop; pop
- Occupations: Record producer; songwriter
- Years active: 1989–present
- Labels: Uptown; Sony Music
- Website: coryrooneyentertainment.com

Mark Cory Rooney is an American record producer. He has been credited on releases for high-profile music industry artists including Michael Jackson, Mary J. Blige, Jessica Simpson, Jennifer Lopez, Marc Anthony, Thalia, Mariah Carey, and Destiny's Child, among others.

== Life and career ==
Rooney was raised in Jamaica, Queens, New York, and at an early age he was exposed to the music industry by his parents, Herb Rooney and Brenda Reid of The Exciters, who toured with The Beatles in the early 1960s. His father later branched out into production and was responsible for both the piano part and production on The Isley Brothers single, "It's Your Thing". When the original members disbanded, his mother, Brenda Reid, brought her children into the band to continue the group. As a teenager he was later a member of a band called The Exciters.

In the 1990s Rooney and Prince Markie Dee of the Fat Boys released two solo albums by Prince Markie Dee including Billboard No. 1 Rap Single "Typical Reasons (Swing My Way)" (written by EMI writer/producer and Rooney's brother-in-law Hasan Johnson). Rooney and Prince Markie Dee formed the group Soul Convention together, when they were signed by Sony Music. Rooney was approached by Sony to sign a solo artist deal but declined. He went on to produce singles including "Real Love" and "Sweet Thing" by Mary J. Blige and "I'll Do 4 U" by Father MC at Uptown Records. Tommy Mottola signed him as a producer and eventually promoted him to vice president of A&R at Epic Records in 1994. Two years later, Rooney became VP of A&R at Crave Records. Mottola subsequently named him Senior VP of Sony Music Entertainment in 1998. Maintaining his position both as senior executive and producer at Sony, he was offered another executive position at Casablanca Records where he also wrote Lindsay Lohan's single, "Rumors". He also produced the album and performed keyboards and provided background vocals. His albums have sold over 100 million copies and many of his albums have sold more than one million records.

He was executive producer on MTV's television series "The Shop" and VH1's series "Born to Diva". "The Shop" is based out of Rooney's barber shop, Mr. Rooney's, in Jamaica, Queens, New York. Artists including Busta Rhymes, Diddy, and Fabolous have appeared on the show for discussions on the music industry, their career, and to chat. VH1's "Born to Diva" featured Rooney as one of the panel judges, aside from his role as executive producer of the show.

Rooney formed his own company, Cory Rooney Group (CRG), which manages writers, producers, and two developing artists. The company focuses on music for television, fashion, and publishing.

== Songwriting and production credits ==
Year	Artist	Song	Album	Songwriter	Producer
1990	Father MC	"Treat Them Like They Want to Be Treated" (feat. Jodeci)	Father's Day	Yes	Yes
1990	Father MC	"I'll Do 4 U" (feat. Mary J. Blige) "Lisa Baby" "Tell Me Something Good" "I Come Correct" "I've Been Watching You" (feat. Lady Kazan) "Ain't It Funky" "Father's Day" "Dance 4 Me" "Why U Wanna Hurt Me"	Father's Day		Yes
1992	Mary J. Blige	"Sweet Thing"	What's the 411?		Yes
1992	Mary J. Blige	"Real Love" "Slow Down" "Changes I've Been Going Through"	What's the 411?	Yes	Yes
1992	Christopher Williams	"Don't You Wanna Make Love"	Changes	Yes	Yes
1992	Father MC	"Everything's Gonna Be Alright" "Red Lace Lingerie" "My Body" "Ladies, I Luv 'Em" "Baby We Can Do It" "On the Road Again"	Close to You	Yes	
1992	Prince Markie Dee	"So Very Happy" "Trippin Out" "Typical Reasons (Swing My Way)" "Trilogy Of Love" "Free" "Addict 4 Your Luv" "Back To Brooklyn" "Foreplay" "I Don't Wanna Lose Your Love" "Ghetto Bound" "Something Special" "I'm Gonna Be Alright" "The Aftermath"	Free		Yes
1993	Mariah Carey	"Do You Think of Me"	Dreamlover (Single)	Yes	Yes
1994	Jade	"Five-Four-Three-Two (Yo! Time Is Up)" "I Like That Way"	Mind, Body & Song	Yes	Yes
1997	Allure	"All Cried Out" (featuring 112)	Allure		Yes
1997	Allure	"Last Chance"	Allure	Yes	Yes
1997	Lisa Stansfield	"Don't Cry for Me"	Lisa Stansfield	Yes	Yes
1997	Mariah Carey	"The Roof (Back in Time)"	Butterfly	Yes	
1997	Mariah Carey	"The Beautiful Ones" (featuring Dru Hill)	Butterfly		Yes
1997	Mariah Carey	"Babydoll"	Butterfly	Yes	Yes
1997	Trey Lorenz	"Make You Happy"	Men in Black: The Album	Yes	Yes
1997	Brian McKnight	"Hold Me"	Anytime	Yes	Yes
1998	Destiny's Child	"Sail On"	Destiny's Child		Yes
1998	Allure and 50 Cent	"Let It Be"	Woo (soundtrack)		Yes
1998	R. Kelly	"We Ride" (featuring Cam'ron, Noreaga, Jay-Z & Vegas Cats)	R.	Yes	Yes
1998	Joe Pesci	"Wise Guy"	Vincent LaGuardia Gambini Sings Just For You		Yes
1999	Jennifer Lopez	"If You Had My Love" "Too Late" "Feelin' So Good" (feat. Big Pun and Fat Joe) "It's Not That Serious"	On the 6	Yes	
1999	Jennifer Lopez	"Should've Never" "Talk About Us"	On the 6	Yes	Yes
1999	Marc Anthony	"When I Dream at Night"	Marc Anthony		Yes
1999	Marc Anthony	"I Need to Know / Dímelo" "You Sang to Me" "No One" "How Could I" "That's Okay" "She's Been Good to Me / Como Ella Me Quiere a Mí"	Marc Anthony	Yes	Yes
1999	Jessica Simpson	"I Think I'm in Love with You"	Sweet Kisses	Yes	Yes
1999	Blaque	"Time After Time"	Blaque		Yes
1999	Blaque	"Bring It All to Me" (featuring JC Chasez)" "Don't Go Looking for Love" "Release Me"	Blaque	Yes	Yes
2000	Thalía	"Menta Y Canela" "Pata Pata"	Arrasando		Yes
2000	Mandy Moore	"Everything My Heart Desires" "The Way to My Heart"	I Wanna Be with You		Yes
2001	Jennifer Lopez	"Play"	J.Lo	Yes	
2001	Jennifer Lopez	"Love Don't Cost a Thing"	J.Lo		Yes
2001	Jennifer Lopez	"I'm Real" "Ain't It Funny" "Cariño" "We Gotta Talk" "Secretly" "I'm Gonna Be Alright"	J.Lo	Yes	Yes
2001	Destiny's Child	"Independent Women"	Survivor	Yes	Yes
2001	Jessica Simpson	"What's It Gonna Be" "His Eye Is on the Sparrow"	Irresistible		Yes
2001	Jessica Simpson	"Hot Like Fire"	Irresistible	Yes	Yes
2002	Jennifer Lopez	"Still" "All I Have" (featuring LL Cool J) "Jenny from the Block" (featuring Styles P and Jadakiss) "You Belong to Me"	This Is Me... Then		Yes
2002	Jennifer Lopez	"Loving You" "I'm Glad" "The One" "Dear Ben" "Again" "I've Been Thinkin'" "Baby I Love U!" "The One" (Version 2)	This Is Me... Then	Yes	Yes
2002	Jennifer Lopez	"Alive"	J to tha L–O! The Remixes	Yes	Yes
2002	Marc Anthony	"Don't Tell Me It's Love" "I Wanna Be Free"	Mended		Yes
2002	Marc Anthony	"Love Won't Get Any Better" "She Mends Me" "I've Got You / Te Tengo Aquí" "I Need You / Me Haces Falta" "Tragedy / Tragedia" "I Reach for You" "I Swear" "Do You Believe in Loneliness" "Give Me a Reason"	Mended	Yes	Yes
2002	Amerie	"Outro"	All I Have	Yes	
2002	Santana	"Nothing at All" (featuring Musiq Soulchild)	Shaman	Yes	Yes
2003	Thalía	"I Want You / Me Pones Sexy" (featuring Fat Joe) "What's It Gonna Be Boy?" "Dance Dance (The Mexican)" "Heridas En El Alma"	Thalía / Thalía (English-language album)	Yes	Yes
2003	Amerie	"I'm Coming Out"	Maid in Manhattan: Music from the Motion Picture		Yes
2004	Lindsay Lohan	"Rumors"	Speak	Yes	Yes
2004	Christina Milian	"Someday One Day" "Hands on Me"	It's About Time	Yes	Yes
2005	Jennifer Lopez	"(Can't Believe) This Is Me"	Rebirth	Yes	
2005	Jennifer Lopez	"Get Right" "Step Into My World" "Whatever You Wanna Do" "I Got U" "Ryde or Die" "He'll Be Back"	Rebirth		Yes
2005	Jennifer Lopez	"Hold You Down" (featuring Fat Joe) "Cherry Pie" "Still Around" "I, Love"	Rebirth	Yes	Yes
2005	Thalía	"Empezar de "0""	El Sexto Sentido		Yes
2005	Toni Braxton	"Stupid"	Libra	Yes	Yes
2006	Jessica Simpson	"Fired Up"	A Public Affair	Yes	
2006	Jessica Simpson	"You Spin Me Round (Like a Record)"	A Public Affair		Yes
2006	Jessica Simpson	"Swing with Me" "Between You & I"	A Public Affair	Yes	Yes
2006	Taylor Hicks	"Heaven Knows"	Taylor Hicks	Yes	
2007	Jennifer Lopez	"Stay Together" "Forever" "Hold It Don't Drop It" "Do It Well" "Gotta Be There" "Never Gonna Give Up" "Mile in These Shoes" "The Way It Is" "Be Mine" "I Need Love" "Wrong When You're Gone" "Brave" "Do It Well" (featuring Ludacris) "Frozen Moments"	Brave		Yes
2008	Menudo	"Lost / Perdido Sin Ti"	Lost (Single)	Yes	Yes
2008	Santana	"This Boy's Fire" (featuring Jennifer Lopez and Baby Bash)	Ultimate Santana		Yes
2014	Michael Jackson	"Chicago"	Xscape	Yes	Yes
2014	Jennifer Lopez	"Never Satisfied" "I Luh Ya Papi" (featuring French Montana) "Acting Like That" (featuring Iggy Azalea) "Let It Be Me" "Tens" (featuring Jack Mizrahi) "Troubeaux" (featuring Nas) "Expertease (Ready Set Go)" "Same Girl" (featuring French Montana) "Charades"	A.K.A.		Yes
2014	Jennifer Lopez	"Booty" (featuring Pitbull)	A.K.A.	Yes	Yes
2014	Jennifer Lopez	"Booty" (featuring Iggy Azalea)	Booty	Yes	Yes
2014	Jessie J	"Keep Us Together"	Sweet Talker	Yes	
2017	Drake	"Teenage Fever"	More Life	Yes	
2020	Brandy	"No Tomorrow"	B7		Yes
