= I Need to Know (Marc Anthony song) =

1999 single by Marc Anthony

Single by Marc Anthony

from the album Marc Anthony
- Released: August 16, 1999
- Genre: Latin; pop; R&B
- Length: 3:47
- Label: Columbia
- Songwriters: Marc Anthony; Cory Rooney
- Producers: Marc Anthony; Cory Rooney

Marc Anthony singles chronology
"No Me Ames" (1999)	"I Need to Know" (1999)	"You Sang to Me" (2000)

"I Need to Know" is a song by American singer Marc Anthony for his eponymous fourth studio album. It was released as the lead single from the album on August 16, 1999. Written and produced by Anthony and Cory Rooney, "I Need to Know" is a song about a man who longs to know how a woman feels about him. The song blends the musical styles of several genres, including R&B and Latin music; the instruments used include synthesized violin and piano sounds, timbales and congas. Anthony recorded a Spanish-language version of the song, translated by Angie Chirino and Robert Blades, titled "Dímelo".

Upon its release, "I Need to Know" received mostly positive reviews from music critics and was praised for its production and choice of musical styles. It was nominated for the Grammy Award for Best Male Pop Vocal Performance in at the 42nd Annual Grammy Awards in 2000. The Spanish-language version of the song won the Latin Grammy Award for Song of the Year at the 1st Annual Latin Grammy Awards in the same year. Both versions of the song won an American Society of Composers, Authors and Publishers award in the pop category. Commercially, the song charted in the top five in Canada and the United States. It was certified gold in Australia and the US "Dímelo" peaked at number one on the Billboard Hot Latin Tracks chart in the US The music video for the song, directed by Paula Walker, was filmed in Los Angeles.

In 2007, American Idol runner-up contestant Blake Lewis performed a cover of "I Need to Know" as part of the Latin round during the show's sixth season. His performance was praised by the judges; Simon Cowell called it the best presentation of the night. However, Lewis's performance received a mixed response from critics; some praised the choice of song while some criticized Lewis's vocal delivery. Lewis recorded the song for his eponymous EP, which peaked at number 16 on the Billboard Bubbling Under Hot 100 Singles.

== Background ==
News that Marc Anthony was recording an English-language album began in 1996 when RMM executive Ralph Mercado mentioned the possibility following a joint-venture between RMM (Anthony's former record label) and MCA Records. Anthony said that he would not record in English until he felt he was ready to do so. After the release of his third studio album Contra la Corriente in 1997, disputes over business practices arose between him and Mercado. Anthony suspected that he was not receiving full payment from his record label for his recordings. Mercado would not allow Anthony to leave the record label because his contract committed Anthony to record four more albums for RMM.

Columbia Records executive Tommy Mottola had approached Anthony to sign a contract with the company to record an album in English during the peak period of Latin artists crossing over the Anglophone market. Nonetheless, his contract with RMM denied Anthony the right to perform in Spanish for Columbia Records. This resulted in a lawsuit against Mercado because Anthony did not want to work under him anymore. As part of the settlement, RMM Records retained the rights to his earlier albums and to release a greatest hits collection from them while Anthony no longer had any obligations to RMM. They released the compilation Desde un Principio: From the Beginning in 1999.

After being signed to Columbia Records, Mottola hired Cory Rooney, Rodney "Darkchild" Jerkins, and Walter Afanasieff to produce Anthony's next album, entitled Marc Anthony. Anthony co-wrote most of tracks on it with them. He described it as his most personal album to date and rebuffed the idea of being another Latin artist to cross over to the Anglophone market because he had already recorded an English-language album titled When the Night is Over (1991). "I Need to Know" was released in the United States on August 16, 1999, as the album's lead single.

== Music and lyrics ==
"I Need to Know" was written and produced by Anthony and Rooney. The song is about a man who longs for a woman's attention and wants to know how she feels about him. The song opens with a synthesized violin and piano riff, which is immediately followed by a mid-tempo beat. It fuses the sound of contemporary R&B and incorporates Latin percussion instruments the timbales, congas, and the trumpet. "I Need to Know" was translated into Spanish by Angie Chirino and Robert Blades; Anthony recorded it and titled it "Dímelo".

== Critical reception ==
In his review of the album Marc Anthony, Stephen Thomas Erlewine from AllMusic called "I Need to Know" a "catchy, mid-tempo single" and said that the music was "gently danceable". Chuck Taylor of Billboard magazine praised the track as "[a]bsolutely smashing", commended the production and musical style of the record and said that Anthony "remains true to his salsa roots with a sexy, swaying cha-cha number". Barry Walters from Entertainment Weekly gave the song a B+ rating, and said the music "flaunts—rather than disguises—its mambo moves" and called it "radical pop waiting to happen." While reviewing songs that were nominated for Record of the Year at the 1st Annual Latin Grammy Awards, an editor for the Los Angeles Times said the track "is the aural scrapbook of an American artist with Latino roots who found the ideal middle ground to satisfy both Anglo and Latino fans". Parry Gettelman of the Orlando Sentinel was more critical of the song, describing it as "hooky but disposable", and he criticized the chorus as "so over-produced". Although Gettelman was more favorable towards "Dímelo", he said the drums in the production are "still annoying as all get-out".

In 2000, "I Need to Know" was nominated Best Male Pop Vocal Performance at the 42nd Annual Grammy Awards, but lost to English musician Sting's song "Brand New Day". In the same year, "Dímelo" received two nominations at the inaugural Latin Grammy Awards for Record of the Year and Best Male Pop Vocal Performance and won the award for Song of the Year. At the 12th Lo Nuestro Awards in 2000, "Dímelo" was nominated in the category for Pop Song of the Year, but lost to "Livin' la Vida Loca" by Ricky Martin. Anthony and Rooney received an American Society of Composers, Authors and Publishers (ASCAP) Pop Award for the commercial success of the song in 2001 and 2002. "Dímelo" was also awarded in the Pop field at the 2001 ASCAP Latin Awards. "I Need to Know" was included on Anthony's greatest hits album Sigo Siendo Yo: Grandes Exitos (2006).

== Chart performance ==
In the United States, the song debuted at number 77 on the Billboard Hot 100 chart on the week of September 11, 1999. In its fourth week on the chart, it rose to number 10. It peaked at number three on the week of November 27, 1999, and remained in that position for two weeks. It also peaked at number 21 on the Billboard Adult Contemporary chart, number seven on the Adult Top 40, number one on the Maxi-Singles Sales chart, and number five on the Mainstream Top 40 chart. "I Need to Know" ranked at number 23 on the Billboard Hot 100 year-end chart in 2000. It was certified gold by the Recording Industry Association of America.

"Dímelo" became a success on the Latin record charts in the United States, where it peaked at number one on the Billboard Hot Latin Tracks chart—making it Anthony's third number one song on the chart. It was the eighth best-performing Latin single of 2000 in the United States.

In Canada, "I Need to Know" peaked at number five on the RPM 100 Hit Tracks chart and at number 11 on the Adult Contemporary Tracks chart. In Europe, the song peaked at number eight in Finland and at number 11 in Norway. In Austria and Switzerland it peaked at number 16. In Oceania, it peaked at number 20 in Australia and in New Zealand. It was certified gold by the Australian Recording Industry Association.

== Promotion ==
Marc Anthony first performed "I Need to Know" live on Good Morning America on July 23, 1999. He also performed the song—together with "That's Okay"—on Saturday Night Live. He also sang it at the 42nd Annual Grammy Awards show; Tom Moon, editor of The Philadelphia Inquirer, called his performance a "sedate reading". In 2009, Anthony performed "I need to Know" during the "Fiesta Latina" event at the South Lawn in Washington, D.C. Chris Richards of The Washington Post said that the audience, which was "flat-footed" during Anthony's previous performances, "was now on its feet". Anthony performed both "I Need to Know" and "Dímelo" on the promotion tour for the album, with the latter song serving as an encore. He performed the song at Madison Square Garden as an encore; this performance was included on the video set The Concert from Madison Square Garden. The song was included on set lists for his Marc Anthony 2002 Tour, Nada Personal Tour, El Cantante Tour, Iconos World Tour, and the Vivir Mi Vida World Tour. "Dímelo" served as the main theme for the Colombian telenovela La Baby Sister. Anthony performed "I Need to Know" live at the 18th Annual Latin Grammy Awards in 2016 along with "Tu Amor Me Hace Bien" and "Vivir Mi Vida" where he was honored Person of the Year by the Latin Recording Academy. Puerto Rican artist Draco Rosa covered the song live at the Person of the Year gala.

The accompanying music video for "I Need to Know" was directed by Paula Walker and was filmed in Los Angeles, California. In the video, Anthony is seen performing the song along with five female dancers in front of an audience at a crowded club. Scenes of him performing the song next to a window and under a staircase to his love interest are interspersed throughout the video.

== Formats and track listings ==
US CD single
No.	Title	Length
1.	"I Need to Know"	3:47
2.	"Dímelo"	3:48

UK CD single
No.	Title	Length
1.	"I Need to Know" (radio edit)	3:17
2.	"I Need to Know" (Joey Musaphia 7-inch radio edit)	3:50
3.	"I Need to Know" (Amen Club Mix)	6:36

7-inch single
No.	Title	Length
1.	"I Need to Know"	3:48
2.	"You Sang to Me"	5:25

12-inch maxi
No.	Title	Length
1.	"I Need to Know" (Pablo Flores Miami Mix)	10:50
2.	"I Need to Know" (Track Masters Remix)	3:58
3.	"I Need to Know" (Pablo's Miami Mix Radio Edit)	4:15
4.	"I Need to Know" (Pablo's Club-Dub)	8:05
5.	"I Need to Know" (album version)	3:48

CD-Maxi
No.	Title	Length
1.	"I Need to Know"	3:48
2.	"I Need to Know" (Track Masters Remix)	3:32
3.	"I Need to Know" (Pablo's Miami Mix Radio Edit)	4:15
4.	"I Need to Know" (D'Ambrosio Club Mix Radio Edit)	3:51

== Credits and personnel ==
Credits are adapted from the Marc Anthony liner notes.

- Marc Anthony – co-production, vocals, songwriting
- Cory Rooney – co-production, keyboards, programming, songwriting
- Tony Maserati - mixing
- Lyndell Fraser - engineering
- David Swope - assistant engineering
- Bobby Allende - percussion
- Angie Chirino – songwriting ("Dímelo")
- Roberto Blades – songwriting ("Dímelo")

== Charts ==
=== Weekly charts ===
Weekly chart performance for "I Need to Know"
Chart (1999–2000)	Peak position
Australia (ARIA)	20
Austria (Ö3 Austria Top 40)	16
Belgium (Ultratip Bubbling Under Flanders)	6
Canada Top Singles (RPM)	5
Canada Adult Contemporary (RPM)	11
Canada Dance/Urban (RPM)	20
Canada CHR (Nielsen BDS)	6
Czech Republic (IFPI)	42
Europe (Eurochart Hot 100)	48
Finland (Suomen virallinen lista)	8
Germany (GfK)	15
Iceland (Íslenski Listinn Topp 40)	37
Italy Airplay (Music & Media)	8
Netherlands (Dutch Top 40)	14
Netherlands (Single Top 100)	18
New Zealand (Recorded Music NZ)	20
Norway (VG-lista)	11
Poland Airplay (Music & Media)	1
Scottish Singles Sales (Official Charts)	61
Sweden (Sverigetopplistan)	19
Switzerland (Schweizer Hitparade)	16
UK Singles (Official Charts)	28
US Billboard Hot 100	3
US Adult Contemporary (Billboard)	21
US Adult Pop Airplay (Billboard)	7
US Dance Club Songs (Billboard)	12
US Dance Singles Sales (Billboard)	1
US Pop Airplay (Billboard)	5
US Rhythmic Airplay (Billboard)	21

Weekly chart performance for "Dímelo"
Chart (1999–2000)	Peak position
US Hot Latin Songs (Billboard)	1
US Latin Pop Airplay (Billboard)	1
US Tropical Airplay (Billboard)	1

=== Year-end charts ===
1999 year-end chart performance for "I Need to Know"
Chart (1999)	Position
Canada Top Singles (RPM)	55
Netherlands (Dutch Top 40)	103
US Billboard Hot 100	79
US Mainstream Top 40 (Billboard)	62
US Maxi-Singles Sales (Billboard)	25
US Rhythmic Top 40 (Billboard)	72

1999 year-end chart performance for "Dímelo"
Chart (1999)	Position
US Hot Latin Tracks (Billboard)	22
US Tropical/Salsa Tracks (Billboard)	14

2000 year-end chart performance for "I Need to Know"
Chart (2000)	Position
Switzerland (Schweizer Hitparade)	98
US Billboard Hot 100	23
US Adult Contemporary (Billboard)	41
US Adult Top 40 (Billboard)	16
US Mainstream Top 40 (Billboard)	43
US Rhythmic Top 40 (Billboard)	90

2000 year-end chart performance for "Dímelo"
Chart (2000)	Position
US Hot Latin Tracks (Billboard)	8
US Tropical/Salsa Tracks (Billboard)	13

=== All-time charts ===
All-time chart performance for "Dímelo"
Chart	Position
US Hot Latin Songs (Billboard)	47

== Certifications ==
Certifications and sales for "I Need to Know"
Region	Certification	Certified units/sales
Australia (ARIA)	Gold	35,000^{^}
United States (RIAA)	Gold	600,000
^{^} Shipments figures based on certification alone.

== Release history ==
Release dates and formats for "I Need to Know"
Region	Date	Format(s)	Label(s)	Ref.
United States	August 16, 1999	Adult contemporary; hot adult contemporary; modern adult contemporary radio	Columbia	
United States	August 16, 1999	7-inch vinyl	Columbia	
United States	August 17, 1999	Rhythmic contemporary; contemporary hit radio	Columbia	
Belgium	October 25, 1999	CD	Columbia	
Japan	October 27, 1999	CD	SME	
United Kingdom	November 1, 1999	CD; cassette	Columbia	

== Blake Lewis version ==
"I Need to Know"

Song by Blake Lewis

from the album Blake Lewis
- Released: 2007
- Recorded: 2007
- Genre: Latin
- Length: 2:29
- Label: 19
- Songwriters: Marc Anthony; Cory Rooney

On the sixth season of American Idol, Blake Lewis performed a cover of "I Need to Know" on April 10, 2007, as part of the program's Latin-themed round. Anthony's then-wife Jennifer Lopez was the guest mentor for the contestants. Lewis's cover of the song was well received by the judges— Paula Abdul, Simon Cowell, and Randy Jackson. However, it received mixed reactions from critics. Joey Guerra of Today called Lewis's choice wise and said Blake "seems like an actual artist". Craig Berman from Houston Chronicle wrote a positive review; he said that the risks Lewis took with his vocals "paid off with the best effort of the night". Michael Slezak of Entertainment Weekly questioned Cowell's comment that Lewis's was the best performance of the night. Slezak wrote that Anthony's cover sounded almost exactly the same as Anthony's original recording. Ann Powers from the Los Angeles Times said that Lewis "perspired and wiggled creepily" in contrast to Anthony's confident performances. Jim Cantiello of MTV wrote that Lewis "finishes each line with an affected orgasmic sigh" and that his performance was "icky".

The studio version of the song was later included on Lewis's eponymous debut EP as part of the American Idol compilation series. His version peaked at number 19 on the Billboard Bubbling Under Hot 100 Singles chart.

== See also ==
- Billboard Top Latin Songs Year-End Chart
- List of number-one Billboard Hot Latin Tracks of 2000
