= Marc Anthony (album) =

Studio album by Marc Anthony
- Released: September 14, 1999
- Recorded: 1998–1999
- Studios: Sony Music Studios (New York City); The Hit Factory (New York City); Cello Studios (Hollywood, Los Angeles, California); The Village (Hollywood, Los Angeles, California); WallyWorld (San Rafael, California); Cove City Sound Studios (Glen Cove, New York); The Dream Factory (New York City); Altamar Music Studio (San Juan, Puerto Rico); Digitec Studios (San Juan, Puerto Rico)
- Genres: Pop; Latin pop; R&B; salsa; soft rock
- Length: 66:56
- Languages: English; Spanish
- Label: Columbia
- Producers: Rodney Jerkins; Marc Anthony; Walter Afanasieff; Cory Rooney; Dan Shea; Emilio Estefan; Ric Wake

Marc Anthony chronology
Contra la Corriente (1997)	Marc Anthony (1999)	Desde un Principio: From the Beginning (1999)

Singles from Marc Anthony
- 1. "I Need to Know" Released: August 15, 1999; 2. "Da la Vuelta" Released: November 9, 1999; 3. "You Sang to Me" Released: February 20, 2000; 4. "My Baby You" Released: August 11, 2000; 5. "When I Dream at Night" Released: September 3, 2000 (EU)

Professional ratings
Review scores
Source	Rating
AllMusic	3/5 stars
Entertainment Weekly	B+
Rolling Stone	3/5 stars

Marc Anthony is the fourth solo studio album overall and first solo English album by American singer Marc Anthony. It was released on September 14, 1999, by Columbia. The album debuted in the top 10 on the US Billboard 200 and has since gone 3× Platinum in the United States. This was Anthony's first English album since his 1991 effort, When the Night Is Over, in which he recorded with Little Louie Vega. It sold more than 4 million copies worldwide.

== Track listing ==
No.	Title	Writer(s)	Length
1.	"When I Dream at Night"	Dan Shea; Robin Thicke	4:21
2.	"Am I the Only One"	Marc Anthony; Walter Afanasieff	4:24
3.	"I Need to Know"	Marc Anthony; Cory Rooney	3:48
4.	"You Sang to Me"	Marc Anthony; Cory Rooney	5:48
5.	"My Baby You"	Marc Anthony; Walter Afanasieff	3:59
6.	"No One"	Marc Anthony; Cory Rooney; Ira Antelis	4:41
7.	"How Could I"	Gordon Chambers; Cory Rooney; Dan Shea	4:28
8.	"That's Okay"	Marc Anthony; Cory Rooney	4:41
9.	"Don't Let Me Leave"	Marc Anthony; Walter Afanasieff	4:50
10.	"Remember Me"	Jonnie Most; Denise Rich	3:48
11.	"She's Been Good to Me"	Rodney Jerkins; Marc Anthony; Corey Rooney; Harvey Mason Jr.; LaShawn Daniels; Fred Jerkins III	4:20
12.	"Love is All"	Arnie Roman	4:30
13.	"Dímelo (I Need to Know)"	Marc Anthony; Cory Rooney; Angie Chirino; Roberto Blades	3:48
14.	"Como Ella Me Quiere a Mí (She's Been Good to Me)"	Rodney Jerkins; Marc Anthony; Corey Rooney; Harvey Mason Jr.; LaShawn Daniels; Fred Jerkins III; Angie Chirino; Roberto Blades	4:20
15.	"Da la Vuelta"	Emilio Estefan; Kike Santander	5:10
Total length:			66:56

== Charts ==
=== Weekly charts ===
Weekly chart performance for Marc Anthony
Chart (1999–2000)	Peak position
Australian Albums (ARIA)	88
Austrian Albums (Ö3 Austria)	8
Belgian Albums (Ultratop Flanders)	34
Canadian Albums (Billboard)	8
Dutch Albums (Album Top 100)	11
Finnish Albums (Suomen virallinen lista)	30
German Albums (Offizielle Top 100)	22
Hungarian Albums (MAHASZ)	24
New Zealand Albums (RMNZ)	5
Norwegian Albums (VG-lista)	1
Spanish Albums (PROMUSICAE)	41
Swedish Albums (Sverigetopplistan)	10
Swiss Albums (Schweizer Hitparade)	9
US Billboard 200	8
US Top Internet Albums (Billboard)	16

=== Year-end charts ===
1999 year-end chart performance for Marc Anthony
Chart (1999)	Position
US Billboard 200	174

2000 year-end chart performance for Marc Anthony
Chart (2000)	Position
Austrian Albums (Ö3 Austria)	44
Canadian Albums (Nielsen SoundScan)	25
Dutch Albums (Album Top 100)	49
German Albums (Offizielle Top 100)	92
Swiss Albums (Schweizer Hitparade)	50
US Billboard 200	38

== Certifications and sales ==
Certifications and sales for Marc Anthony
Region	Certification	Certified units/sales
Canada (Music Canada)	2× Platinum	200,000^{^}
Denmark (IFPI Danmark)	Platinum	20,000^{‡}
Netherlands (NVPI)	Gold	50,000^{^}
New Zealand (RMNZ)	Platinum	15,000^{^}
Norway (IFPI Norway)	Platinum	50,000^{*}
Spain (Promusicae)	Gold	70,000
Sweden (GLF)	Gold	40,000^{^}
Switzerland (IFPI Switzerland)	Gold	25,000^{^}
United States (RIAA)	3× Platinum	3,000,000^{^}
^{*} Sales figures based on certification alone.^{^} Shipments figures based on certification alone.^{‡} Sales+streaming figures based on certification alone.
