= Patrick Hernandez =

French singer (born 1949)

- Born: Patrick Pierre Hernandez; 6 April 1949 (age 77); Le Blanc-Mesnil, Seine-Saint-Denis, France
- Genres: Disco; Eurodisco
- Occupation: Singer
- Instrument: Vocals
- Years active: 1960s–present
- Label: Columbia

Patrick Pierre Hernandez (born 6 April 1949) is a French singer who had a worldwide hit with "Born to Be Alive" in 1979.

== Biography ==
Born to a Spanish father and an Italian/Austrian mother in Le Blanc-Mesnil, Seine-Saint-Denis, Hernandez grew up in the 1960s and was interested in music. He toured dance halls and ballrooms in southern France with a number of groups over the next decade. Hernández met his music partner Hervé Tholance, an arranger, guitarist, and vocalist, during that period. The two formed a duo and achieved local success backing French musicians such as Francis Cabrel, Laurent Voulzy, and the French group Gold.

In 1978, Hernandez met the producer Jean Vanloo with disco music at its peak, and signed a recording contract. Hernandez went to Waterloo, Belgium to work on songs.

=== "Born to Be Alive" ===
After working for about a year, the songs were released on the Aariana sub-label Aquarius Records (in France) in November 1978. The first single that was released was the disco song "Born to Be Alive". Its success was immediate, and in January 1979, Hernandez received his first gold record from Italy. The song spread throughout Europe, where it hit #1 in France in April and remained there until July. By then, the United States had caught on, and after some remixing, the record was signed to the A-Tom-Mik label and later Columbia Records. The remixed version was released on a commercial 12" single; it peaked on the US Billboard disco chart at #1 and crossed over to the Billboard Hot 100 peaking at #16. It sold over one million copies in the US. The track reached #10 in the UK Singles Chart. By year's end, Hernandez had racked up 52 gold and platinum records from more than 50 countries.

=== After "Born to Be Alive" ===
While Hernandez was touring the United States, he was accompanied by Vanloo and his friend Jean-Claude Pellerin. Vanloo and Pellerin held auditions in New York that spring for dancers to accompany Hernández on his worldwide tour. The chosen dancers included a young Madonna, whom he dated briefly.

Hernandez's follow-ups to "Born to Be Alive" did not fare as well in the US. "Disco Queen" backed with "Show Me the Way You Kiss" sold poorly, but the album Born to Be Alive sold well and won him a Billboard Award in February 1980. As a result of this lack of subsequent success he has earned the title of "one-hit wonder".

In 1981, Hernandez released the import 12" single of "Goodbye", first released on Aariana Records and then a remixed version on the parent-label Aquarius Records (in France). It was not released in the US, although an album followed the single's release, but found no market in the US.

== Discography ==
=== Studio albums ===
- Born to Be Alive (1979)
- Crazy Day's Mystery Night's (1980)
- Good Bye (1981)

=== Compilation albums ===
- Born to Be Alive (1990) (released in the US in 1995 as The Best of Patrick Hernandez – Born to Be Alive)
- Best of Patrick Hernandez – Born to Be Alive (1998)

=== Singles ===
| Year | Single | Chart positions | | | | | | | | | | | | | |
| Year | Single | AUS | AUT | BEL | CAN | ESP | FRA | GER | IRE | IT | NED 40 | NED 100 | UK | US | US Dance |
|---|---|---|---|---|---|---|---|---|---|---|---|---|---|---|---|
| 1978 | "I Give You Rendez-Vous" (France-only release) | — | — | — | — | — | — | — | — | — | — | — | — | — | — |
| 1979 | "Born to Be Alive" | 1 | 1 | 2 | 1 | 1 | 1 | 1 | 21 | 1 | 5 | 12 | 10 | 16 | 1 |
| 1979 | "Disco Queen" | — | — | 26 | — | — | — | — | — | — | — | — | — | — | 88 |
| 1979 | "You Turn Me On" (with Hervé Tholance) | — | — | — | — | — | — | — | — | — | — | — | — | — | — |
| 1979 | "Back to Boogie" (with Hervé Tholance) | — | — | — | — | — | 11 | 39 | — | — | 25 | 31 | — | — | — |
| 1980 | "Someone's Stepping on My Mushrooms" (with Jorge Ben) | — | — | — | — | — | — | — | — | — | — | — | — | — | — |
| 1980 | "Can't Keep It Up" | — | — | — | — | — | — | — | — | — | — | — | — | — | — |
| 1981 | "Down on Easy Street" | — | — | — | — | — | — | — | — | — | — | — | — | — | — |
| 1981 | "Losing Sleep Over You" | — | — | — | — | — | — | — | — | — | — | — | — | — | — |
| 1981 | "Good Bye" | — | — | 37 | — | — | — | — | — | — | — | — | — | — | — |
| 1982 | "Y'a toujours des sam'dis soir" | — | — | — | — | — | — | — | — | — | — | — | — | — | — |
| 1982 | "Fais-moi calin" | — | — | — | — | — | — | — | — | — | — | — | — | — | — |
| 1982 | "Non Stop" | — | — | — | — | — | — | — | — | — | — | — | — | — | — |
| 1983 | "Tallulah" | — | — | — | — | — | 97 | — | — | — | — | — | — | — | — |
| 1988 | "Kalisha Kalima" | — | — | — | — | — | — | — | — | — | — | — | — | — | — |
| 1988 | "Born to Be Alive" (Remix '88) | — | — | — | — | — | — | — | — | — | 21 | 20 | — | — | — |
| 1991 | "The Drinks (Are on Me)" | — | — | — | — | — | — | — | — | — | — | — | — | — | — |
| 1997 | "Get Ready" | — | — | — | — | — | — | — | — | — | — | — | — | — | — |
"—" denotes releases that did not chart or were not released in that territory.
