= List of songs recorded by Jennifer Lopez =

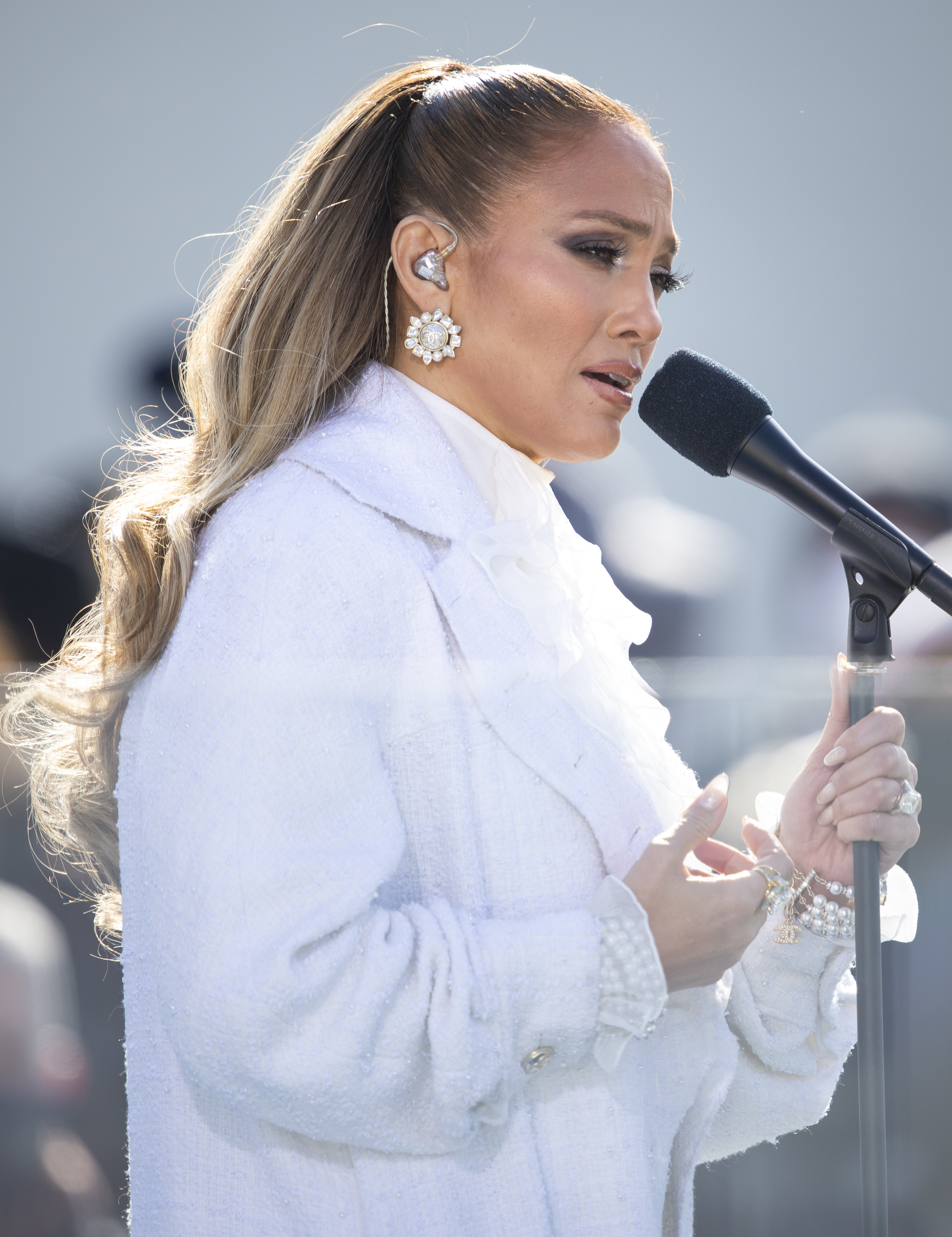
Lopez in 2021

Jennifer Lopez is an American entertainer who has recorded songs in English and Spanish. In addition to recording material for her eight studio albums and two compilation albums, she has also contributed music to film soundtracks, charity records and television advertisements and has collaborated with other recording artists on their respective albums. Lopez, who began her career in musical theater, re-entered the music scene upon her portrayal of the title role in the Selena biopic of the same name (1997). The role inspired her to launch a career in music. She then recorded a demo in Spanish and her manager Benny Medina sent it the Work Group, who showed an interest in signing her. Tommy Mottola, the head of the label, advised her to sing in English instead.

Lopez's debut album, On the 6 (1999), incorporates different parts of Lopez's life and upbringing, and marked the beginning of Lopez exploring the topic of love, a theme she continued to explore throughout her future albums.

== Released songs ==
Indicates English-language recording
Indicates Spanish-language recording
Indicates Bilingual recording

Released songs recorded by Jennifer Lopez(The writer(s) of each song can be viewed by selecting "show")
Song	Other performer(s)	Writer(s)	Originating album	Year	Ref.
"A.K.A."	T.I.	Leon Youngblood; Steven Franks; Terence Coles; Trevion Stokes; Mark Pitts; Kristina Marie Stephens; Clifford Joseph Harris Jr. Jennifer Lopez	A.K.A.	2014	
"Acting Like That"	Iggy Azalea	Leon Youngblood; Yoni Ayal; Terence Coles; James "JDoe" Smith; Mark Pitts; Kristina Marie Stephens; Amelia Amethyst Kelly; Jennifer Lopez	A.K.A.	2014	
"Adiós"	—N/a	Estéfano; Julio Reyes	Como Ama una Mujer	2007	
"Adrenalina"	Wisin; Ricky Martin	Jennifer Lopez; Ricky Martin; Juan Luis Morera; José Torres; Carlos E. Ortiz	El Regreso del Sobreviviente	2014	
"Adrenalina (Spanglish Version)"	Ricky Martin; Wisin	Jennifer Lopez; Ricky Martin; Juan Luis Morera; José Torres; Carlos E. Ortiz	—N/a	2014	
"Again"	—N/a	Jennifer Lopez; Cory Rooney; Troy Oliver; Reggie Hamlet	This Is Me... Then	2002	
"Ain't It Funny"	—N/a	Jennifer Lopez; Cory Rooney	J.Lo	2001	
"Ain't It Funny (Murder Remix)" (Note: "Ain't It Funny (Murder Remix)" contains a sample of "Flava in Ya Ear" (1994), as written by Osten Harvey and Craig Mack and performed by Mack.)	Ja Rule; Caddillac Tah	Jennifer Lopez; Cory Rooney; Irving Lorenzo; Jeffery Atkins; Caddillac Tah; Ashanti Douglas	J to tha L–O! The Remixes	2002	
"Ain't Your Mama"	—N/a	Meghan Trainor; Theron Thomas; Jacob Kasher Hindlin; Gamal "Lunchmoney" Lewis; Henry Walter; Lukasz Gottwald	—N/a	2016	
"Alive"	—N/a	Jennifer Lopez; Cris Judd; Cory Rooney	J to tha L–O! The Remixes	2002	
"All I Have" (Note: "All I Have" contains a sample of "Very Special", as written by Lisa Peters and William Jeffrey and performed by Debra Laws.)	LL Cool J	Jennifer Lopez; Makeba Riddick; Curtis Richardson; Ron G Lisa Peters; William Jeffrey	This Is Me... Then	2002	
"Amarte es Todo"	—N/a	Estéfano; Julio Reyes	Como Ama una Mujer	2007	
"Amar es Para Siempre"	—N/a	Peter Zizzo; Manny Benito	On the 6	1999	
"Amor Se Paga con Amor" (Note: "Amor Se Paga con Amor" is Spanish-language re-recording of "Love Don't Cost a Thing".)	—N/a	Damon Sharpe; Greg Lawson; Georgette Franklin; Jeremy Monroe; Amille Harris; Manny Benito	J.Lo	2001	
"Apresúrate"	—N/a	Marc Anthony; Estéfano; José Luis Pagan	Como Ama una Mujer	2007	
"Back It Up"	Prince Royce; Pitbull	—N/a	Double Vision	2015	
"Back It Up (Spanish Version)"	Prince Royce; Pitbull	—N/a	—N/a	2015	
"Baby I Love U!" (Note: "Baby I Love U!" (This Is Me... Then, 2002) contains an interpolation of "Midnight Cowboy" (1969), written and performed by John Barry.)	—N/a	Jennifer Lopez; Cory Rooney; Dan Shea; John Barry	This Is Me... Then	2002	
"Baby I Love U! (R. Kelly Remix)" (Note: The "R. Kelly Remix" of "Baby I Love U!" (The Reel Me, 2003) features new production and additional verses performed by R. Kelly.)	R. Kelly	Jennifer Lopez; Cory Rooney; Dan Shea; John Barry; R. Kelly	The Reel Me	2003	
"Baila"	—N/a	Emilio Estefan Jr. Jon Secada; George Noriega; Randall Barlow	Music of the Heart	1999	
"Bailar Nada Más" (Note: "Bailar Nada Más" is Spanish-language re-recording of "Dance Again" (2012).)	—N/a	RedOne; Enrique Iglesias; Bilal The Chef; AJ Junior	—N/a	2012	
"Be Mine" (Note: "Be Mine" (Brave, 2007) contains a sample of "Sunny", written by Bobby Hebb and performed by Paul Mauriat.)	—N/a	Michelle Lynn Bell; Peter Wade Keusch; Rhonda Robinson; John Hill; Caleb Shreve; Jennifer Lopez	Brave	2007	
"Brave"	—N/a	Christian Karlsson; Pontus Winnberg; Ezekiel Lewis; Balewa Muhammad; Patrick Smith; Candice Nelson	Brave	2007	
"Booty"	Pitbull	Cory Rooney; Jennifer Lopez; Benny Medina; Chris Brown; Asia Bryant; Armando Perez; Thomas Wesley Pentz; Lewis D. Gittus; Tedra Renee Wilson; Danny Omerhodic	A.K.A.	2014	
"Booty"	Iggy Azalea	Cory Rooney; Jennifer Lopez; Benny Medina; Chris Brown; Asia Bryant; Armando Perez; Thomas Wesley Pentz; Lewis D. Gittus; Tedra Renee Wilson; Danny Omerhodic; Amethyst Amelia Kelly	—N/a	2014	
"Can't Believe"	—N/a	—N/a	J.Lo	2001	
"(Can't Believe) This Is Me"	—N/a	Jennifer Lopez; Marc Anthony; Cory Rooney	Rebirth	2005	
"Can't Get Enough"	—N/a	Jennifer Lopez	This Is Me... Now	2024	
"Cariño" (Note: "Cariño" (J.Lo, 2001) was recorded in both English and Spanish under the same title.)	—N/a	Jennifer Lopez; Cory Rooney; Manny Benito; Neal Creque; Jose Sanchez; Frank Rodriguez; Guillermo Edghill Jr. Mongo Santamaria	J.Lo	2001	
"Cariño"	—N/a	Jennifer Lopez; Cory Rooney; Manny Benito; Neal Creque; Jose Sanchez; Frank Rodriguez; Guillermo Edghill Jr. Mongo Santamaria	J.Lo	2001	
"Charades"	—N/a	Leon Youngblood; Qura Rankin; Tina Davis; Mark Pitts; Kristina Marie Stephens; Jennifer Lopez	A.K.A.	2014	
"Charge Me Up"	—N/a	RedOne; AJ Junior; BeatGeek; Teddy Sky; Jimmy Joker	Love?	2011	
"Cherry Pie"	—N/a	Jennifer Lopez; Tim Kelley; Bob Robinson; Cory Rooney	Rebirth	2005	
"Come Over"	—N/a	Sean Combs; Michelle Bell; Kip Collins; Mario Winans	J.Lo	2001	
"Como Ama una Mujer"	—N/a	Estéfano; Julio Reyes	Como Ama una Mujer	2007	
"Control Myself" (Note: "Control Myself" (Todd Smith, 2006) contains a samples of the song "Looking for the Perfect Beat" (1983), written by John Miller, Afrika Bambaataa, Arthur Baker and John Robie and performed by Afrika Bambaataa and the Soulsonic Force.)	LL Cool J	James Todd Smith; Jermaine Dupri; James Phillips; Ryan Toby; Arthur Baker; John Robie; Afrika Bambaataa; John Miller	Todd Smith	2006	
"Could This Be Love"	—N/a	Lawrence Dermer	On the 6	1999	
"Dame (Touch Me)"	Chayanne	Manny Benito; Rodney Jerkins; Fred Jerkins III; LaShawn Daniels; Mischke	J.Lo	2001	
"Dance Again"	—N/a	RedOne; Enrique Iglesias; Bilal "The Chef"; AJ Junior	—N/a	2012	
"Dance Again"	Pitbull	RedOne; Enrique Iglesias; Bilal "The Chef"; AJ Junior; Armando Perez	Dance Again... the Hits	2012	
"Dance with Me"	—N/a	Sean Combs; Mario Winans; Jack Knight; Michael Jones; Mechalie Jamison	J.Lo	2001	
"Dear Ben"	—N/a	Jennifer Lopez; Cory Rooney; Bernard Edwards Jr.	This Is Me... Then	2002	
"Do It Well" (Note: "Do It Well" (Brave, 2007) contains a sample of "Keep on Truckin'" (1973), written by Leonard Caston Jr., Anita Poree and Frank Wilson and performed by Eddie Kendricks.)	—N/a	Ryan Tedder; Leonard Caston Jr. Anita Poree; Frank Wilson	Brave	2007	
"Do It Well" (Note: Remix of "Do It Well" (Brave, 2007) featuring an additional verse from rapper Ludacris.)	Ludacris	Ryan Tedder; Christopher Bridges; Leonard Caston Jr. Anita Poree; Frank Wilson	Brave	2007	
"Drinks for You (Ladies Anthem)"	Pitbull	Armando Perez; Jennifer Lopez; Daniel Woodis Jr. Urales Vargas; Monica Rustgi	Global Warming	2012	
"Dynamite (Remix)" (Note: Remix of "Dynamite" (Rokstarr, 2009) featuring additional vocals from Lopez.)	Taio Cruz	Taio Cruz; Lukasz Gottwald; Max Martin; Bonnie McKee; Benjamin Levin	—N/a	2010	
"El Anillo"	—N/a	Andrés Castro; DalePlay; Oscarcito; Edgar Barrera	—N/a	2018	
"El Deseo de Tu Amor" (Note: Several song on On the 6 (1999) were re-recorded in Spanish for its release in Spanish-speaking territories.: "Amar es Para Siempre" is a Spanish language re-recording of "Promise Me You'll Try".; "El Deseo de Tu Amor" is a Spanish language re-recording of "Open Off My Love".; "Una Noche Más" is a Spanish language re-recording of "Waiting for Tonight".)	—N/a	Darrell Branch; Kyra Lawrence; Lance Rivera; Manny Benito	On the 6	1999	
"El Ultimo Adios"	Various	Emilio Estefan Jr. Gian Marco	—N/a	2001	
"Emotions"	—N/a	Chris Brown; Chantal Kreviazuk; Shama Joseph; Cory Rooney; Jennifer Lopez	A.K.A.	2014	
"Es Amor"	—N/a	Jose Sanchez; Frank Rodriguez; Guillermo Edghill Jr. Manny Benito	On the 6	1999	
"Escapémonos"	Marc Anthony	Estéfano; Julio Reyes	Amar Sin Mentiras	2004	
"Everybody's Girl"	—N/a	Mike Caren; Oliver Goldstein; Diana Gordon; Shep Crawford	Love?	2011	
"Expertease (Ready Set Go)"	—N/a	Warren Felder; Steve Mostyn; Sia Furler; Jennifer Lopez	A.K.A.	2014	
"Feel the Light"	—N/a	Tor Erik Hermansen; Mikkel Storleer Eriksen; Kiesa Rae Ellestad; Emile Haynie	Home	2015	
"Feelin' So Good" (Note: "Feelin' So Good" (On the 6, 1999) contains a sample of the song "Set It Off" (1984), written by Steven Standard and performed by Strafe.)	Big Pun; Fat Joe	Cory Rooney; Jennifer Lopez; Christopher Rios; Joe Cartagena; Sean Combs; Steven Standard	On the 6	1999	
"Feelin' So Good (Bad Boy Remix)" (Note: The "Bad Boy Remix" of "Feelin' So Good" (J to tha L–O! The Remixes, 2002) features new production and additional verses from rappers P. Diddy and G. Dep.)	P. Diddy; G. Dep	Cory Rooney; Jennifer Lopez; Christopher Rios; Joe Cartagena; Sean Combs; Steven Standard	J to tha L–O! The Remixes	2002	
"Follow the Leader"	Wisin & Yandel	Juan Luis Morera; Llandel Veguilla; Jonas Saeed; Jennifer Lopez; Tasha Gayle; Niclas Kings; Nailah Thorbourne; Nyanda Thorbourne; Candace Thorbourne	Líderes	2012	
"First Love"	—N/a	Max Martin; Savan Kotecha; Ilya Salmanzadeh	A.K.A.	2014	
"Forever"	—N/a	Balewa Muhammad; Candice Nelson; Ezekiel Lewis; Patrick Smith; Chauncey Hollis	Brave	2007	
"Fresh Out the Oven"	Pitbull	Pharrell Williams; Amanda Gosein; Jennifer Lopez; Armando Perez	—N/a	2009	
"Frozen Moments"	—N/a	Michelle Lynn Bell; Peter Wade Keusch	Brave	2007	
"Get Right" (Note: "Get Right" (2005) contains elements of "Soul Power '74" (1974), written by James Brown and performed by Maceo & the Macks.)	—N/a	Rich Harrison; James Brown	Rebirth	2005	
"Get Right" (Note: Remix of "Get Right" (Rebirth, 2005) featuring an additional verse from rapper Fabolous.)	Fabolous	Rich Harrison; James Brown	Rebirth	2005	
"Girls"	—N/a	Dijon McFarlane; Asia Bryant; Jennifer Lopez	—N/a	2014	
"Girls"	Tyga	Dijon McFarlane; Asia Bryant; Michael Stevenson; Jennifer Lopez	A.K.A.	2014	
"Goin' In"	Flo Rida	Michael Warren; Jamahl Listenbee; Joseph Angel; Coleridge Tillman; David Quinones; Tramar Dillard	Dance Again... the Hits	2012	
"Good Hit"	—N/a	Terius Nash; Christopher Stewart	Love?	2011	
"Gotta Be There" (Note: "Gotta Be There" (Brave, 2007) contains a sample of "I Wanna Be Where You Are" (1972), written by Leon Ware and Arthur Ross and performed by Michael Jackson.)	—N/a	Adam Gibbs; Michael Chesser; Crystal Johnson; Travis Cherry; Leon Ware; Arthur Ross	Brave	2007	
"Hands"	Justin Tranter; Julia Michaels; BloodPop; Britney Spears; Selena Gomez; Mark Ronson; Gwen Stefani; Kacey Musgraves; Jason Derulo; Meghan Trainor; Juanes; Pink; Mary J. Blige; Halsey; Troye Sivan; Ty Herndon; Dan Reynolds; Adam Lambert; Trans Chorus of Los Angeles; MNEK; Alex Newell; Mary Lambert; Prince Royce; Jussie Smollett; Nate Ruess; RuPaul	Justin Tranter; Julia Michaels; BloodPop	—N/a	2016	
"He'll Be Back"	—N/a	Walter Millsap III; Candice Nelson; Timothy Mosley	Rebirth	2005	
"Hold It Don't Drop It" (Note: "Hold It Don't Drop It" (Brave, 2007) contains a sample of "It Only Takes a Minute" (1975), written by Dennis Lambert and Brian Potter and performed by Tavares.)	—N/a	Kevin Risto; Waynne Nugent; Jennifer Lopez; Allen Phillip Lees; Tawana Dabney; Janet Sewell; Cynthia Lissette; Dennis Lambert; Brian Potter	Brave	2007	
"Hold You Down" (Note: "Hold You Down" (Rebirth, 2005) contains elements of "As We Lay" (1985), written by Larry Troutman and Billy Beck and performed by Shirley Murdock.)	Fat Joe	Gregory Christopher; Gregory Bruno; Makeba Riddick; Joe Cartagena; Cory Rooney; Larry Troutman; Billy Beck	Rebirth	2005	
"Hold You Down (Cory Rooney Spring Mix)"	Fat Joe	Gregory Christopher; Gregory Bruno; Makeba Riddick; Joe Cartagena; Cory Rooney; Larry Troutman; Billy Beck	—N/a	2005	
"Hypnotico"	—N/a	RedOne; Lady Gaga; Aliaune Thiam; Claude Kelly; Tami Chynn	Love?	2011	
"I'm Glad" (Note: "I'm Glad" (This Is Me... Then, 2002) contains a sample of "P.S.K. What Does It Mean?", as written and performed by Jesse "Schoolly D" Weaver Jr.)	—N/a	Jennifer Lopez; Troy Oliver; Cory Rooney; Andre Deyo; Jesse Weaver Jr.	This Is Me... Then	2002	
"I'm Gonna Be Alright" (Note: "I'm Gonna Be Alright" (J.Lo, 2001) contains an uncredited sample of "8th Wonder" (1981), performed by the Sugarhill Gang.)	—N/a	Jennifer Lopez; Cory Rooney; Troy Oliver; Lorraine Cheryl Cook; Ronald LaPread	J.Lo	2001	
"I'm Gonna Be Alright (Track Masters Remix)" (Note: The "Track Masters Remix" of "I'm Gonna Be Alright" (J to tha L–O! The Remixes, 2002) features new production. In the initial pressings of J to tha L–O! The Remixes, 50 Cent appeared on the song. In later pressings, his rap was removed in favor of a solo version. When issued as a single, a version of the song featuring Nas was released. The version featuring Nas was later included as a bonus track on some editions of This Is Me... Then. (2002)) (Note: "I'm Gonna Be Alright (Track Masters Remix)" (J to tha L–O! The Remixes, 2002) contains a sample of "Why You Treat Me So Bad" (1986) performed by Club Nouveau.)	—N/a	Jennifer Lopez; Cory Rooney; Troy Oliver; Lorraine Cheryl Cook; Ronald LaPread; Samuel Barnes; Jean-Claude Olivier	J to tha L–O! The Remixes	2002	
"I'm Gonna Be Alright (Track Masters Remix)"	50 Cent	Jennifer Lopez; Cory Rooney; Troy Oliver; Lorraine Cheryl Cook; Ronald LaPread; Samuel Barnes; Jean-Claude Olivier	J to tha L–O! The Remixes	2002	
"I'm Gonna Be Alright (Track Masters Remix)"	Nas	Jennifer Lopez; Cory Rooney; Troy Oliver; Lorraine Cheryl Cook; Ronald LaPread; Samuel Barnes; Jean-Claude Olivier	This Is Me... Then	2002	
"I'm Into You" (Note: In Europe, a version of "I'm Into You" (2011) was released featuring an additional verse performed by Lopez.)	Lil Wayne	Taio Cruz; Mikkel S. Eriksen; Tor Erik Hermansen; Dwayne Carter	Love?	2011	
"I'm Real" (Note: "I'm Real" (J.Lo, 2001) contains an uncredited sample of "Firecracker" (1978), performed by Yellow Magic Orchestra.)	—N/a	Jennifer Lopez; Troy Oliver; Cory Rooney; Leshan Lewis; Martin Denny	J.Lo	2001	
"I'm Real (Murder Remix)" (Note: "I'm Real (Murder Remix)" (J.Lo, 2001) contains a sample of "Mary Jane" (1978), written and performed by Rick James)	Ja Rule	Jennifer Lopez; Troy Oliver; Cory Rooney; L.E.S. Jeffrey Atkins; Irving Lorenzo; Rick James	J.Lo	2001	
"I'm Waiting"	—N/a	Mario Winans; Sean Combs; Michael Jones; Jack Knight; Adonis Shropshire; Keisha Spivey	J.Lo	2001	
"I've Been Thinkin'"	—N/a	Jennifer Lopez; Cory Rooney; Dan Shea	This Is Me... Then	2002	
"I've Got the Music in Me"	—N/a	Bias Boshell	—N/a	2012	
"I Got U"	—N/a	Rodney Jerkins; Fred Jerkins III; Delisha Thomas; LaShawn Daniels; Aaron Pearce	Rebirth	2005	
"I Need Love" (Note: "I Need Love" (Brave, 2007) contains a sample of "Use Me" (1972), written and performed by Bill Withers.)	—N/a	Michelle Lynn Bell; Peter Wade Keusch; Rhonda Robinson; John Hill; Caleb Shreve; Jennifer Lopez	Brave	2007	
"I, Love"	—N/a	Tim Kelley; Bob Robinson; Cory Rooney	Rebirth	2005	
"If You Had My Love"	—N/a	Rodney Jerkins; LaShawn Daniels; Cory Rooney; Fred Jerkins III	On the 6	1999	
"Invading My Mind"	—N/a	RedOne; AJ Junior; BeatGeek; Teddy Sky; Bilal The Chef; Jimmy Joker	Love?	2011	
"It's Not That Serious"	—N/a	Rodney Jerkins; LaShawn Daniels; Cory Rooney; Fred Jerkins III; Jennifer Lopez	On the 6	1999	
"Jenny from the Block" (Note: "Jenny from the Block" (This Is Me... Then, 2002) contains an interpolation of "Hi-Jack" (1975), written by José Fernando Arbex Miró and performed by Enoch Light and the Light Brigade. The song contains a portion of "South Bronx" (1987), written by Lawrence Parker, Scott Sterling and performed by Boogie Down Productions. It also contains a portion of "Heaven and Hell Is on Earth" (1975), written by Michael Oliver and performed by the 20th Century Steel Band.)	Styles; Jadakiss	Jennifer Lopez; Troy Oliver; Andre Deyo; Samuel Barnes; Jean-Claude Olivier; José Fernando Arbex Miró; Lawrence Parker; Scott Sterling; Michael Oliver; David Styles; Jason Phillips	This Is Me... Then	2002	
"Kiss of the Spider Woman"	—N/a	John Kander; Fred Ebb	Kiss of the Spider Woman (Original Motion Picture Soundtrack)	2025	
"Let It Be Me"	—N/a	Harmony Samuels; Kirby Lauryen; Jennifer Lopez	A.K.A.	2014	
"Let's Get Loud"	—N/a	Gloria Estefan; Kike Santander	On the 6	1999	
"Live It Up"	—N/a	RedOne; Alex Papaconstantinou; Björn Djupström; Viktor Svensson; Achraf Janussi; Bilal "The Chef" Hajji	—N/a	2013	
"Live It Up"	Pitbull	RedOne; Alex Papaconstantinou; Björn Djupström; Viktor Svensson; Armando Perez; Achraf Janussi; Bilal "The Chef" Hajji	—N/a	2013	
"Louboutins"	—N/a	Terius Nash; Christopher Stewart	—N/a	2009	
"Love Don't Cost a Thing"	—N/a	Damon Sharpe; Greg Lawson; Georgette Franklin; Jeremy Monroe; Amille Harris	J.Lo	2001	
"Love Don't Cost a Thing (RJ Schoolyard Mix)" (Note: The "RJ Schoolyard Mix" of "Love Don't Cost a Thing" (J to tha L–O! The Remixes, 2002) features new production and additional verses from Fat Joe.)	Fat Joe	Damon Sharpe; Greg Lawson; Georgette Franklin; Jeremy Monroe; Amille Harris; Joe Cartagena	J to tha L–O! The Remixes	2002	
"Love Make the World Go Round"	Lin-Manuel Miranda	Jennifer Lopez; Lin-Manuel Miranda; Mike Molina; Marcus Lomax; Jordan Johnson; Stefan Johnson; Melody Noel Hernandez; John Mitchell; Nelson Kyle	—N/a	2016	
"Loving You" (Note: "Loving You" (This Is Me... Then, 2002) contains samples of "Never Give Up on a Good Thing" (1981), as written by Michael Garvin and Tom C. Shapiro and performed by George Benson and "Juicy Fruit" (1983), as written by James Mtume and performed by Mtume.)	—N/a	Troy Oliver; Cory Rooney; James Mtume; Michael Garvin; Tom Shapiro	This Is Me... Then	2002	
"I Luh Ya Papi"	French Montana	Noel Fisher; Andre Proctor; Karim Kharbouch; Jennifer Lopez	A.K.A.	2014	
"Me Haces Falta"	—N/a	Marc Anthony; Estéfano	Como Ama una Mujer	2007	
"Mile in These Shoes"	—N/a	Chasity Nwagbara; Onique Williams	Brave	2007	
"Never Gonna Give Up"	—N/a	Michelle Lynn Bell; Peter Wade Keusch; Jennifer Lopez	Brave	2007	
"Never Satisfied"	—N/a	Alejandro Salazar; Ilsey Juber; Jennifer Lopez	A.K.A.	2014	
"No Me Ames"	Marc Anthony	Giancarlo Bigazzi; Marco Falagiani; Ignacio Ballesteros; Aleandro Baldi	On the 6	1999	
"On the Floor" (Note: "On the Floor" and its Spanish version re-recording "Ven a Bailar" (Love?, 2011) interpolate "Llorando Se Fue" (1989), written by Gonzales Hermosa and Ulises Hermosa and performed by Kaoma.)	Pitbull	RedOne; Kinda Hamid; AJ Junior; Teddy Sky; Bilal The Chef; Armando Perez; Gonzalo Hermosa; Ulises Hermosa	Love?	2011	
"The One" (Note: "The One" and "The One (Version 2)" (This Is Me... Then, 2002) contains an interpolation of "You Are Everything" (1971), as written by Thom Bell and Linda Creed and performed by The Stylistics)	—N/a	Jennifer Lopez; Cory Rooney; Linda Creed; Davy Deluge; Thom Bell	This Is Me... Then	2002	
"The One (Version 2)"	—N/a	Jennifer Lopez; Cory Rooney; Linda Creed; Davy Deluge; Thom Bell	This Is Me... Then	2002	
"One Love"	—N/a	Jennifer Lopez; Anesha Birchett; Antea Shelton; Emile Dernst II	Love?	2011	
"One Step at a Time"	—N/a	Jennifer Lopez	Every Mother Counts	2011	
"Open Off My Love"	—N/a	Darrell Branch; Kyra Lawrence; Lance Rivera	On the 6	1999	
"Papi"	—N/a	RedOne; AJ Junior; BeatGeek; Teddy Sky; Bilal The Chef; Jimmy Joker	Love?	2011	
"Physical"	Enrique Iglesias	Enrique Iglesias; Tiyon Mack; Sandy Wilhelm; Carlos Paucar	Sex and Love	2014	
"Play"	—N/a	Anders Bagge; Arnthor Birgisson; Christina Milian; Cory Rooney	J.Lo	2001	
"Pleasure Is Mine"	—N/a	Shelly Peiken; Guy Roche	J.Lo	2001	
"Por Arriesgarnos"	—N/a	Estéfano; Julio Reyes	Como Ama una Mujer	2007	
"Porque Te Marchas" (Note: "Porque Te Marchas" (Como Ama una Mujer, 2007) is a Spanish language re-recording of "(Can't Believe) This Is Me" (Rebirth, 2005).)	—N/a	Marc Anthony; Estéfano	Como Ama una Mujer	2007	
"Promise Me You'll Try"	—N/a	Peter Zizzo	On the 6	1999	
"Qué Hiciste"	—N/a	Marc Anthony; Julio Reyes; Jimena Romero	Como Ama una Mujer	2007	
"Qué Ironía" (Note: "Qué Ironía" is a Spanish language re-recording of "Ain't It Funny" (J.Lo, 2001).)	—N/a	Jennifer Lopez; Cory Rooney; Manny Benito	J.Lo	2001	
"Quién Será"	—N/a	Pablo Beltrán Ruiz	Como Ama una Mujer	2007	
"Quizás, Quizás, Quizás"	Andrea Bocelli	Osvaldo Farrés	Passione	2013	
"Run the World"	—N/a	Terius Nash; Christopher Stewart	Love?	2011	
"Ryde or Die"	—N/a	Robert Smith; Blake English; Brandy Norwood	Rebirth	2005	
"Same Girl"	—N/a	Chris Brown; Antwan Thompson; Charles Stephens III; Ryan M. Tedder; Jennifer Lopez	—N/a	2014	
"Same Girl"	French Montana	Chris Brown; Antwan Thompson; Charles Stephens III; Ryan M. Tedder; Jennifer Lopez	A.K.A.	2014	
"Secretly"	—N/a	Jennifer Lopez; Cory Rooney; Troy Oliver; Kalilah Shakir	J.Lo	2001	
"A Selena Tribute: Como la Flor / Bidi Bidi Bom Bom / Amor Prohibido / I Could Fall in Love / No Me Queda Mas"	—N/a	Brian Keith Thomas; Ricky Vela; A.B. Quintanilla III; Selena Quintanilla; Pete Astudillo	—N/a	2015	
"Should've Never"	—N/a	Jennifer Lopez; Cory Rooney; Samuel Barnes; Jean-Claude Olivier; Tonino Baliardo; Nicolas Reyes	On the 6	1999	
"Si Ya Se Acabó"	—N/a	Manny Benito; Jimmy Greco; Ray Contreras	J.Lo	2001	
"So Good"	—N/a	Leon Youngblood; Yoni Ayal; Taylor Parks; Yacoub Kasawa; Mark Pitts; Kristina Marie Stephens; Jennifer Lopez	A.K.A.	2014	
"Sola"	—N/a	Estéfano; Julio Reyes	Como Ama una Mujer	2007	
"Spanish Fly"	Black Rob	Madonna Ciccone; Bruce Gaitsch; J. Graham; Patrick Leonard; David Lee Roth; Sadao Watanabe	Life Story	1999	
"Starting Over"	—N/a	Diana Gordon; Nathaniel Hills; Marcella Araica	Love?	2011	
"Stay Together"	—N/a	J. R. Rotem; Chasity Nwagbara; E. Kidd Bogart	Brave	2007	
"Step Into My World"	—N/a	Rodney Jerkins; Delisha Thomas; Fred Jerkins III; Hector Diaz	Rebirth	2005	
"Still" (Note: "Still" (This Is Me... Then, 2002) contains elements of "Set Me Free" (1979), as written by LeRoy Bell and Casey James and performed by Teddy Pendergrass.)	—N/a	Jennifer Lopez; Rich Shelton; Kevin Veney, Loren Hill; Leonard Huggins; LeRoy Bell; Casey James	This Is Me... Then	2002	
"Still Around"	—N/a	Antwan Patton; Archie Hall; Cory Rooney	Rebirth	2005	
"Sweet Spot"	Flo Rida	—N/a	Wild Ones	2012	
"T.H.E. (The Hardest Ever)"	will.i.am Mick Jagger	William Adams; Kenneth Oliver; Dallas Austin	—N/a	2012	
"Take Care" (Note: "Take Care" (Love?, 2011) contains elements of "I Like It" (1982), written by Eldra DeBarge, William Randell DeBarge and Etterlene Jordan and performed by DeBarge.)	—N/a	Christopher Stewart; Ester Dean; Makeba Riddick; Robyn Fenty; Mikkel S. Eriksen; Tor Erik Hermansen; Robert Thompson; Eldra DeBarge; William DeBarge; Etterlene Jordan	Love?	2011	
"Talk About Us"	—N/a	Cory Rooney	On the 6	1999	
"Te Voy a Querer"	—N/a	Estéfano; Pilar Quiroga; Jimmy Paredes	Como Ama una Mujer	2007	
"Tens"	Jack Mizrahi	Jovan JR Taylor; Antwan Thompson; Charles Stephens III; Jennifer Lopez	A.K.A.	2014	
"That's Not Me"	—N/a	Sean Combs; Mario Winans; Kandice Love	J.Lo	2001	
"That's the Way"	—N/a	Rodney Jerkins; LaShawn Daniels; Fred Jerkins III; Nora Payne	J.Lo	2001	
"Theme from Mahogany (Do You Know Where You're Going To)"	—N/a	Michael Masser; Gerald Goffin	On the 6	1999	
"This Boy's Fire"	Santana	Ronald Bryant; Raymond Diaz; Sean Garrett; Steve Morales	Ultimate Santana	2007	
"Toma de Mi"	—N/a	Nelly Furtado; Julio Reyes	El Cantante	2007	
"Too Late"	—N/a	Jennifer Lopez; Cory Rooney; Alvin West	On the 6	1999	
"Troubeaux"	Nas	Andrew Wansel; Warren Felder; Steve Mostyn; Tiyon Mack; Ursula Yancy; Nasir Jones; Jennifer Lopez; Marty Balin; Paul Kantner	A.K.A.	2014	
"Try Me"	Jason Derulo; Matoma	—N/a	Everything Is 4	2015	
"Tú"	—N/a	Marc Anthony; Estéfano; Julio Reyes	Como Ama una Mujer	2007	
"Una Noche Más"	—N/a	Maria Christensen; Michael Garvin; Phil Temple; Manny Benito	On the 6	1999	
"Until It Beats No More"	—N/a	Troy Johnson; Evan Bogart; Jörgen Elofsson	Love?	2011	
"Ven a Bailar"	Pitbull	RedOne; Kinda Hamid; AJ Junior; Teddy Sky; Bilal The Chef; Armando Perez; Gonzalo Hermosa; Ulises Hermosa; Julio Copello; Jimena Romero	Love?	2011	
"Venus"	—N/a	Robbie van Leeuwen	—N/a	2011	
"Villain"	—N/a	Terius Nash; Christopher Stewart	Love?	2011	
"Waiting for Tonight"	—N/a	Maria Christensen; Michael Garvin; Phil Temple	On the 6	1999	
"Walking on Sunshine"	—N/a	Jennifer Lopez; Mario Winans; Sean Combs; Michael Jones; Jack Knight; Karen Anderson; Adonis Shropshire; Mechalie Jamison	J.Lo	2001	
"The Way It Is" (Note: "The Way It Is" (Brave, 2007) contains a sample of "She's a Lady", as written by Gennaro Leone and Bruce Rudd and performed by Great Pride.)	—N/a	Michelle Lynn Bell; Peter Wade Keusch; Jennifer Lopez; Rhonda Robinson; Gennaro Leone; Bruce Rudd	Brave	2007	
"We Are One (Ole Ola)"	Pitbull; Claudia Leitte	Jennifer Lopez; Claudia Leitte; Armando Perez; Thomas Troelsen; Daniel Murcia; Sia Furler; Lukasz Gottwald; Henry Walter; RedOne	One Love, One Rhythm	2014	
"We Gotta Talk"	—N/a	Jennifer Lopez; Tina Morrison; Cory Rooney; Joe Kelley; Steve Estiverne; Troy Oliver	J.Lo	2001	
"(What Is) Love?"	—N/a	Diana Gordon; Emile Dernst II	Love?	2011	
"What You Mean to Me"	Trey Songz	Gary Barlow; Eliot Kennedy	Finding Neverland: The Album	2015	
"What's Going On"	Various	Al Cleveland; Renaldo Benson; Marvin Gaye	—N/a	2001	
"Whatever You Wanna Do" (Note: "Whatever You Wanna Do" (Rebirth, 2005) contains elements of "Con-Funk-Shun" (1970), as written by Delma Churchill, Harvey Fuqua and Kenneth Hawkins and performed by The Nite-Liters)	—N/a	Rich Harrison; Delma Churchill; Harvey Fuqua; Kenneth Hawkins	Rebirth	2005	
"Worry No More"	Rick Ross	Noel Fisher; Jake Troth; William Leonard Roberts II; Jennifer Lopez	A.K.A.	2014	
"Wrong When You're Gone"	—N/a	Ezekiel Lewis; Patrick Smith; Balewa Muhammad; Candice Nelson; Keri Hilson	Brave	2007	
"You Belong to Me"	—N/a	Carly Simon; Michael McDonald	This Is Me... Then	2002	

== Unreleased songs ==
Indicates English-language recording
Indicates Spanish-language recording
Indicates Bilingual recording

Unreleased songs recorded by Jennifer Lopez(The writer(s) of each song can be viewed by selecting "show")
Song	Other performer(s)	Writer(s)	Intended album	Leak	Ref
"Amnesia"	—N/a	—N/a	Por Primera Vez (cancelled)	No	
"A Tu Lado"	Nicky Jam	—N/a	Por Primera Vez (cancelled)	No	
"Beautiful"	—N/a	Chris Sernel	Love?	No	
"Breaking Down Wait"	—N/a	Michelle Lynn Bell; Peter Wade Keusch; Teron Beal	—N/a	No	
"Breaking Me Down"	—N/a	—N/a	—N/a	Yes	
"Clothes Off"	—N/a	Kristin Boutilier; Brent Kutzle; David Listenbee; Ryan Tedder	—N/a	No	
"Dime Que Me Esperas"	—N/a	—N/a	Por Primera Vez (cancelled)	No	
"Dos"	J Balvin	—N/a	Por Primera Vez (cancelled)	No	
"Él"	—N/a	—N/a	Por Primera Vez (cancelled)	No	
"Event"	—N/a	Michelle Lynn Bell; Peter Wade Keusch	—N/a	No	
"Faint"	—N/a	Anesha Birchett; Antea Birchett; Christopher Grayson; Kateeb Muhammad	Love?	Yes	
"Feelin' This"	—N/a	Darius Rustam; Matt Nybert; Eric Sanicola	—N/a	No	
"Get on the Mic"	—N/a	Michelle Lynn Bell; Peter Wade Keusch; Duane Harriott	—N/a	No	
"Greatest Part of Me"	—N/a	Sean Hall; Thaddis Harrell; Kelly Sheehan	Love?	Yes	
"Heart and Soul"	—N/a	unknown	—N/a	No	
"Hooked on You"	—N/a	Anesha Birchett; Aneta Birchett; Christopher Grayson; Kateeb Muhammad	Love?	Yes	
"Hurricane"	—N/a	Gharah Degeddingseze; Fannie Bell Johnson; Erin Stevenson	—N/a	No	
"I Can Get Him Back"	—N/a	Walter Millsap; Candice Nelson; Timothy Mosley	—N/a	No	
"I Wanna Love"	Maxwell	—N/a	A.K.A.	No	
"In My Life"	—N/a	Walter Millsap; Candice Nelson; Timothy Mosley	—N/a	No	
"Keeper"	—N/a	Britney Bereal; Luke Boyd	Love?	No	
"Love and War"	—N/a	Anesha Birchett; Antea Birchett; Nathaniel Hills	Love?	No	
"Love Changes Everything"	—N/a	Andrew Lloyd Webber; Don Black; Charles Hart	J.Lo	No	
"Love Come Down"	—N/a	Kashif	J.Lo	No	
"Love Like Mine"	—N/a	Phil Temple; Rex Rideout; Helena Marshall	—N/a	No	
"Love Line"	Robin Thicke; Wiz Khalifa	—N/a	A.K.A.	No	
"Love Is What I Feel"	—N/a	Maria Christensen; Richie Jones; Eric Kupper	—N/a	No	
"Make It Pop"	—N/a	Walter Millsap; Candice Nelson; Timothy Mosley	Rebirth	No	
"Mírate"	—N/a	—N/a	Por Primera Vez (cancelled)	No	
"Mouth 2 Mouth"	Enrique Iglesias	—N/a	Euphoria Reloaded	Yes	
"No More Games for Love"	—N/a	Chris Brown	A.K.A.	No	
"On the Radio"	—N/a	Donna Summer; Giorgio Moroder	—N/a	Yes	
"One Day"	Various	Sean Garrett	—N/a	No	
"Ooh"	—N/a	Arnthor Birgisson; Sean Garrett; Rami Yacoub	—N/a	No	
"Out on the Floor"	—N/a	Damon Sharpe; Greg Lawson; Curtis Bedeau	On the 6	Yes	
"Por Primera Vez"	—N/a	—N/a	Por Primera Vez (cancelled)	No	
"Que Se Joden"	—N/a	—N/a	Por Primera Vez (cancelled)	No	
"Recordándote"	Maluma	—N/a	Por Primera Vez (cancelled)	No	
"Story of My Life"	—N/a	Amanda Ghost	Love?	Yes	
"This Cannot Be Love"	—N/a	Michaela Shiloh; Rodney Jerkins	Love?	No	
"Two Sides"	—N/a	Michelle Lynn Bell; Peter Wade Keusch	—N/a	No	
"Un Poquito de tu Amor"	—N/a	—N/a	Por Primera Vez (cancelled)	No	
"Vivir Sin Ti"	—N/a	—N/a	—N/a	No	
"We Loved"	—N/a	Jennifer Lopez	A.K.A.	No	
"What I Call Love"	—N/a	—N/a	—N/a	Yes	
"What Is Love? Part II"	—N/a	Diana Gordon; Dernst Emile	Love?	Yes	
