= J to tha L–O! The Remixes =

Remix album by Jennifer Lopez
- Released: February 1, 2002
- Genres: House; hip hop; R&B
- Length: 49:45
- Label: Epic

Jennifer Lopez chronology
J.Lo (2001)	J to tha L–O! The Remixes (2002)	This Is Me... Then (2002)

Singles from J to tha L–O! The Remixes
- 1. "I'm Real (Murder Remix)" Released: September 4, 2001; 2. "Ain't It Funny (Murder Remix)" Released: January 7, 2002; 3. "I'm Gonna Be Alright (Track Masters Remix)" Released: April 1, 2002; 4. "Alive" Released: April 29, 2002

J to tha L–O! The Remixes is the first remix album by American singer Jennifer Lopez. It was released on February 1, 2002, by Epic Records. The album contains remixes from Lopez's first two studio albums, On the 6 (1999) and J.Lo (2001). It features artists such as P. Diddy, Ja Rule, Fat Joe and Nas, and includes dance and hip-hop remixes of past singles.

On release, J to tha L–O! The Remixes garnered mixed reviews from music critics. A commercial success, it debuted atop the US Billboard 200, with first-week sales of 156,000 units, becoming the first remix album ever to reach the chart's summit, and Lopez's second number-one album. The first two singles, "I'm Real (Murder Remix)" and "Ain't It Funny (Murder Remix)", both featuring Ja Rule, reached number one on the US Billboard Hot 100. "I'm Gonna Be Alright (Track Masters Remix)" reached number 10 on the Billboard Hot 100, while "Alive" failed to chart. With worldwide sales of more than three million units, J to tha L–O! The Remixes became the fifth best-selling remix album of all time.

== Background and development ==
Lopez's second album, J.Lo (2001) debuting at the top spot of the Billboard 200 in the United States, followed by a successful re-release on July 24, 2001 (Lopez's 32nd birthday). Following the success of J.Lo, Lopez and Epic Records announced plans to create a remix album. On December 18, 2001, MTV News reported that Lopez had teamed up with Ja Rule (who was featured on her song "I'm Real (Murder Remix)" which topped the Billboard Hot 100) and other artists for her remix album, which would be released in February.

It was also announced that Lopez would rework her 2001 single, "Ain't It Funny" into a Murder Remix which would feature Ja Rule. Ashanti wrote three verses and demoed the new version of "Ain't It Funny" for Lopez. "I got a call from Gotti in Los Angeles. He asked me to write another verse [...] I had to write it over the phone and two-way Irv the lyrics." Ashanti's vocals were later added to the final song as background vocals.

On January 18, 2002, Epic Records confirmed that a Lopez's live DVD and remix album would be arriving soon. Lopez's ex-boyfriend Sean Combs produced and featured on a reworked version of "Feelin' So Good" for the album. "Alive", a ballad which was created for her thriller film Enough (2002) was the only original song written for the album by Lopez and her ex-husband Cris Judd. The song speaks of not being afraid anymore. Track Masters produced a remix of "I'm Gonna Be Alright" which served as the album's second official single; 50 Cent and Nas's vocals were added to separate versions of the song in its commercial release. This was not without controversy; Lopez and Epic Records picked Nas to be featured on the radio version due to his popularity on the music charts, which upset 50 Cent, who felt betrayed by Nas. Despite, at this time 50 Cent was still an upcoming artist. According to rumors, 50 Cent hadn't hard feelings for Lopez, but did "hate" Nas. Lopez's management said this was all completely business.

The 50 Cent–featured version appeared on the American pressing of J to tha L–O!: The Remixes album (however, some editions feature a no-rap version) while the Nas-featured version appears on the European pressing of Lopez's 2002 album This Is Me... Then. Commercial CD singles were issued containing Nas' version. The 2002 U.S. compilation Now That's What I Call Music! 10 also contains the version featuring Nas. "I'm Gonna Be Alright" features a bassline from Club Nouveau's "Why You Treat Me So Bad". Pablo Flores reworked "Let's Get Loud" with more of a charged dance beat, with a house interpretation of "Waiting For Tonight" included too. All of the songs remixed on J to tha L–O! The Remixes had previously been released as singles from their respective albums, with the exception of "Walking On Sunshine" and "I'm Gonna Be Alright", which was released as a single from the remix album only.

== Singles ==
The album spawned three new singles, two of which attained chart success. The first single from the album, "Ain't It Funny (Murder Remix)" was released on January 7, 2002. The single topped the U.S. Billboard Hot 100 becoming Lopez's third number-one single and Ja Rule's third number-one single.

"I'm Gonna Be Alright (Track Masters Remix)", which was previously on her J.Lo album and was officially released as the album's second single on April 1, 2002; impacting the charts by July 2002 and reached the top 10 of the Billboard Hot 100. "I'm Gonna Be Alright" spent 23 weeks on the chart.

"Alive" was released as the album's third single on April 29, 2002. It received limited release, failing to enter the Billboard Hot 100. However, the song did chart on Billboard Hot Dance Club Play at number two. "Alive" was the album's only original work. Lopez performed the song during an appearance on The Oprah Winfrey Show on May 17, 2002.

== Critical reception ==
Professional ratings
Review scores
Source	Rating
AllMusic	2.5/5 stars
Entertainment Weekly	D+
NME	(6/10)
Q	3/5 stars
Rolling Stone Album Guide	2/5 stars
Slant	3.5/5 stars
Yahoo! Music UK	5/10 stars

J to tha L -O! The Remixies received mixed to positive reviews by music critics, In his review of the album, Dele Fadele of NME gave a positive review and said "Whilst Jennifer Lopez is no Salvador Dalí, she remains a consummate pop artist of the day [...] She won't necessarily win awards for vocal gymnastics, but her range is perfectly suited to this collection of upbeat dancefloor cuts (with the obligatory affirmative power ballad, 'Alive'). Cynics might've seen collaborations with Ja Rule, Fat Joe and Trackmasters as a way of getting some hip-hop shine, if Lopez hadn't been so resolutely down with the programme for a while now. As tracks proceed further, from Latino House abstracts to Spanish versions of previous hits, it's apparent the agenda here is mainly fun. Just dance, OK."

David Browne from Entertainment Weekly gave the album a negative review, stating: "Thoughts that occur while listening to this dreary, unrepentant piece of product: (1) The fad of rappers guesting on pop singles truly helps when it comes to Lopez, since you hear less of her; (2) for a dance-club record, these mixes are surprisingly limp; (3) the last song, a syrupy ballad called "Alive", cowritten with her new husband, is neither alive nor a remix; (4) if you listen to this long enough, you may actually be conned into thinking Lopez's voice and songs are passable; (5) as a result of No. 4, this may be the most insidious album ever made." Eric Danton from the Hartford Courant called the title "ridiculous", but judged that the album itself was an improvement. A reviewer from the Boston Herald wrote "Like a mini-greatest hits album, J to Tha Lo eliminates the filler from both On the 6 and J.Lo. It also makes a good case for the just competent singer as the ultimate party doll. And, in the case of "Ain't it Funny" and "I'm Real", "The Remixes" gives you the hit versions you've actually been seeing on MTV."

== Commercial performance ==
It was the first remix album to debut at the top of the US Billboard 200 chart, and became one of the best-selling remix albums in the US, selling 156,000 copies during its opening week. In addition, it dethroned Alan Jackson's Drive from the number one spot on the chart, which had spent 3 consecutive weeks at the top. The album dropped to 3 on the chart in its second week, with sales of 134,000 copies, the same week its single "Ain't It Funny (Murder Remix) was number 3 on the Hot 100 Singles chart. In its third week it returned to the top of the Billboard 200 with sales of 102,000 that week, while "Ain't It Funny" reached the summit of the Billboard Hot 100, making Lopez the only artist in history to have a remix single and a remix album both at number-one in the Billboard Hot 100 and Billboard 200 at the same week.

J to tha L-O: The Remixes sold 624,000 copies within its first month, and stayed in the top 10 of the Billboard 200 for a month, and by June 2013 had sold 1.5 million copies in the United States, becoming the third best-selling remix album of all time, after Michael Jackson's Blood on the Dance Floor: HIStory in the Mix and Madonna's You Can Dance. It remained the only remix album to debut at number one in the United States until four months later, when ex-boyfriend Sean "P. Diddy" Combs debuted at number 1 on Billboard with the collaboration album We Invented the Remix released on May 14, 2002; and the only remix release by a solo artist for nearly 10 years until Justin Bieber's remix effort in 2011 debuted at the top spot with similar opening sales.

Year	Award	Category	Result	Ref.
2003	Guinness World Records	First Remix Album to debut at Number One on the US Billboard 200	Won	
2003	NRJ Music Awards	International Album of the Year	Nominated	

== Track listing ==
No.	Title	Writer(s)	Producer(s)	Length
1.	"Love Don't Cost a Thing" (RJ Schoolyard Mix featuring Fat Joe)	Damon Sharpe; Greg Lawson; Georgette Franklin; Jeremy Monroe; Amille D. Harris; Joseph Cartagena	Ric Wake; Cory Rooney^{[a]}; Richie Jones^{[b]}	4:18
2.	"Ain't It Funny (Murder Remix)" (featuring Ja Rule and Caddillac Tah)	Jennifer Lopez; Rooney; Irving Lorenzo; 7; Jeffrey Atkins; Ashanti; Caddillac Tah	Rooney; Dan Shea; Irv Gotti^{[b]}	3:49
3.	"I'm Gonna Be Alright" (Track Masters remix featuring 50 Cent)	Lopez; Rooney; Troy Oliver; Lorraine Cheryl Cook; Ronald LaPread; Jean Claude Olivier; Samuel Barnes; Curtis Jackson	Rooney; Oliver; Poke & Tone^{[b]}	3:53
4.	"I'm Real (Murder Remix)" (featuring Ja Rule)	Lopez; Oliver; Rooney; L.E.S.; Atkins; Lorenzo; Rick James	Rooney; Oliver; Gotti^{[b]}	4:18
5.	"Walking on Sunshine" (Metro remix)	Lopez; Mario Winans; Sean "Puffy" Combs; Michael "Lo" Jones; Jack Knight; Karen Anderson; Adonis Shropshire; Mechalie Jamison	Combs; Winans; Rooney; Mark Taylor^{[b]}; Jeff Taylor^{[b]}	5:50
6.	"If You Had My Love" (Dark Child Master Mix)	Rodney Jerkins; LaShawn Daniels; Rooney; Fred Jerkins III	R. Jerkins	4:11
7.	"Feelin' So Good" (Bad Boy remix featuring P. Diddy and G. Dep)	Rooney; Lopez; Christopher Rios; Cartagena; Combs; Steven Standard	Combs; Winans	4:27
8.	"Let's Get Loud" (Castle Hill Club Mix [*Misprint Incorrectly titled Pablo Flores remix])	Gloria Estefan; Kike Santander	Emilio Estefan; Santander; Pablo Flores^{[b]}	5:29
9.	"Play" (Sack International remix)	Anders Bagge; Arnthor Birgisson; Christina Milian; Rooney	BAG & Arnthor; Peter Wade Keusch^{[b]}; Alec Deruggiero^{[b]}	4:18
10.	"Waiting for Tonight" (Hex's Momentous Video remix [*Misprint Incorrectly titled Hex's Momentous Radio Mix])	Maria Christensen; Michael Garvin; Phil Temple	Wake; Jones^{[b]}; Hex Hector^{[b]}	4:32
11.	"Alive"	Lopez; Cris Judd; Rooney	Rooney; Shea	4:40
Total length:				49:45

Re-issue
No.	Title	Writer(s)	Producer(s)	Length
3.	"I'm Gonna Be Alright" (Track Masters remix)	Lopez; Rooney; Oliver; Cook; LaPread; Olivier; Barnes	Rooney; Oliver; Poke & Tone^{[b]}	3:20

European edition bonus tracks
No.	Title	Writer(s)	Producer(s)	Length
12.	"Si Ya Se Acabo" (Radio remix)	Jimmy Greco; Manny Benito; Ray Contreras	Greco; Benito; Contreras	3:33
13.	"Que Ironia (Ain't It Funny)" (Tropical Dance remix)	Lopez; Rooney; Benito	Rooney; Oliver	3:48
14.	"Una Noche Más" (Pablo's Miami Mix Radio Edit)	Benito; Christiansen; Garvin; Temple	Wake; Jones	4:05
15.	"No Me Ames" (duet with Marc Anthony) (Tropical remix)	Aleandro Baldi; Giancarlo Bigazzi; Marco Falagiani; Ignacio Ballesteros	E. Estefan; Shea Juan; Vincente Zambrano	5:02

European re-issue bonus track
No.	Title	Writer(s)	Producer(s)	Length
16.	"I'm Gonna Be Alright" (Track Masters remix featuring Nas)	Lopez; Rooney; Oliver; Cook; LaPread; Olivier; Barnes	Rooney; Oliver; Poke & Tone^{[b]}	2:52

Sample credits

- "Ain't It Funny (Murder remix)" contain a sample from Craig Mack's "Flava in Ya Ear" as written by Osten Harvey Jr. and Mack.
- "I'm Gonna Be Alright (Track Masters remix)" contains a replay of Club Nouveau's "Why You Treat Me So Bad" as written by A. Hill, M. Thompson, and M. Marshall.
- "I'm Real (Murder remix)" includes in an interpolation of the song "Mary Jane" as written and performed by Rick James.

Notes On later pressings of the album, the third track, "I'm Gonna Be Alright" (Track Masters remix) does not feature 50 Cent.

- ^{^a} denotes additional producer
- ^{^b} denotes additional remix producer

== Charts ==
=== Weekly charts ===
Chart (2002–2003)	Peak position
Australian Albums (ARIA)	11
Australian Urban Albums (ARIA)	2
Austrian Albums (Ö3 Austria)	11
Belgian Albums (Ultratop Flanders)	8
Belgian Albums (Ultratop Wallonia)	9
Canadian Albums (Nielsen SoundScan)	11
Canadian R&B Albums (Nielsen SoundScan)	2
Danish Albums (Hitlisten)	67
Dutch Albums (Album Top 100)	5
European Albums Chart	6
French Albums (SNEP)	14
German Albums (Offizielle Top 100)	5
Greek Foreign Albums (IFPI)	8
Icelandic Albums (Tónlist)	12
Irish Albums (IRMA)	6
Japanese Albums (Oricon)	44
New Zealand Albums (RMNZ)	3
Polish Albums (ZPAV)	16
Scottish Albums (Official Charts)	6
Spanish Albums (PROMUSICAE)	30
Swedish Albums (Sverigetopplistan)	39
Swiss Albums (Schweizer Hitparade)	14
UK Albums (Official Charts)	4
UK R&B Albums (Official Charts)	1
US Billboard 200	1
US Top R&B/Hip-Hop Albums (Billboard)	1

=== Year-end charts ===
Year-end chart performance for J to tha L–O! The Remixes
Chart (2002)	Position
Australian Urban Albums (ARIA)	11
Belgian Albums (Ultratop Flanders)	48
Belgian Albums (Ultratop Wallonia)	72
Canadian Albums (Nielsen SoundScan)	69
Canadian R&B Albums (Nielsen SoundScan)	11
Dutch Albums (Album Top 100)	48
European Albums (Music & Media)	38
French Albums (SNEP)	97
German Albums (Offizielle Top 100)	44
New Zealand Albums (RMNZ)	33
Swiss Albums (Schweizer Hitparade)	98
UK Albums (OCC)	48
US Billboard 200	49
US Top R&B/Hip-Hop Albums (Billboard)	48
Worldwide Albums (IFPI)	34

== Certifications and sales ==
Region	Certification	Certified units/sales
Australia (ARIA)	Gold	35,000^{^}
Canada (Music Canada)	Platinum	100,000^{^}
France (SNEP)	Gold	100,000^{*}
Netherlands (NVPI)	Gold	40,000^{^}
New Zealand (RMNZ)	Gold	7,500^{^}
South Korea	—	10,713
United Kingdom (BPI)	Platinum	452,000
United States (RIAA)	Platinum	1,500,000
Summaries
Europe	—	800,000
Worldwide	—	3,000,000
^{*} Sales figures based on certification alone.^{^} Shipments figures based on certification alone.

== Release history ==
Country	Date	Format	Label	Ref.
Australia	February 1, 2002	CD	Sony	
Canada	February 5, 2002	CD	Sony	
United States	February 5, 2002	CD	Epic	
United States	February 12, 2002	Cassette; LP	Epic	
Japan	February 20, 2002	CD	Sony	
Poland	March 14, 2002	CD	Sony	
France	March 15, 2002	CD	Sony	
Denmark	March 18, 2002	CD	Sony	
Finland	March 18, 2002	CD	Sony	
Italy	March 18, 2002	CD	Sony	
Norway	March 18, 2002	CD	Sony	
Sweden	March 18, 2002	CD	Sony	
United Kingdom	March 18, 2002	CD	Sony	
France	September 9, 2002	CD	Sony	

== See also ==
- List of best-selling remix albums worldwide
