= Only Make Believe =

Studio album by Bell & James
- Released: 1979
- Genre: R&B
- Label: A&M

Bell & James chronology
Bell & James (1978)	Only Make Believe (1979)	In Black and White (1980)

Only Make Believe is the second studio album by American musical group Bell & James, released in 1979 by A&M Records.

== Critical reception ==
Professional ratings
Review scores
Source	Rating
AllMusic	3/5 stars
The New Rolling Stone Record Guide	3/5 stars

The Nevada State Journal called the album an "inoffensive but innocuous brand of R&B." Stereo Review deemed it a "Recording of Special Merit," writing that "there is an airiness to the melodies, which have a flavor often more reminiscent of Hall and Oates than of r-&-b."

== Track listing ==
All tracks are written by Bell & James.

Side A
No.	Title	Length
1.	"Shakedown"	5:00
2.	"(Babe) You Don't Love Me Like You Should"	4:15
3.	"Only Make Believe"	5:27
4.	"Stay"	4:29

Side B
No.	Title	Length
1.	"Say It's Gonna Last Forever"	4:54
2.	"Laughing in the Face of Love"	4:12
3.	"Nobody Knows It"	4:31
4.	"Fare Thee Well"	5:16

== Credits ==
- Drums, guitar, percussion, congas, vocals – LeRoy Bell
- Executive producer – Thom Bell
- Keyboards, synthesizer, guitar, bass, percussion, vocals – Casey James
- Producer – Bell & James
