= I'm Gonna Be Alright =

2002 song by Jennifer Lopez

"I'm Gonna Be Alright" (Track Masters remix)

Single by Jennifer Lopez featuring Nas

from the album J to tha L–O! The Remixes
- B-side: "Alive"; "Pleasure Is Mine"; "Walking on Sunshine"
- Released: April 1, 2002
- Studio: Sony Music (New York City)
- Genre: Hip hop; R&B
- Length: 2:51
- Label: Epic
- Songwriters: Jennifer Lopez; Cory Rooney; Troy Oliver; Lorraine Cheryl Cook; Ronald LaPread; Jean-Claude Olivier; Samuel Barnes; Nasir Jones; Anthony O'Brian; Anthony Wright; Nathaniel Chase; Sylvia Robinson; Denzil Foster; Thomas McElroy; Jay King; Curtis Jackson
- Producers: Trackmasters; Cory Rooney

Jennifer Lopez singles chronology
"Ain't It Funny" (Murder Remix) (2002)	"I'm Gonna Be Alright" (Track Masters remix) (2002)	"Alive" (2002)

Nas singles chronology
"Got Ur Self a Gun" (2001)	"I'm Gonna Be Alright" (Track Masters remix) (2002)	"One Mic" (2002)

Music video
- "I'm Gonna Be Alright" (Track Masters remix) on YouTube

"I'm Gonna Be Alright" is a song by American singer Jennifer Lopez from her second studio album, J.Lo (2001). It was written by Lopez, Lorraine Cheryl Cook, Ronald LaPread and producers Cory Rooney and Troy Oliver. "I'm Gonna Be Alright" was remixed by Poke & Tone of Trackmasters for Lopez's first remix album, J to tha L–O! The Remixes (2002). It was released on April 1, 2002, by Epic Records as the album's second single. The remix features rapper Nas and peaked at number 10 on the US Billboard Hot 100 chart, becoming Lopez's sixth US top-10 single.

The original Track Masters remix features 50 Cent. At the time of the single release, Epic Records chose Nas for the radio version. Nas re-recorded new rap verses and the track was cut down to 2:52, becoming the Track Masters remix radio edit. Nas replacing 50 Cent caused controversy; and the rappers, who were previously like "brothers" have resented each other since. The remix's beat contains re-adaptions of the instrumental used on Luniz's 1995 song "I Got 5 on It" featuring Michael Marshall, a song which itself sampled Club Nouveau's 1987 song "Why You Treat Me So Bad".

== Music and production ==
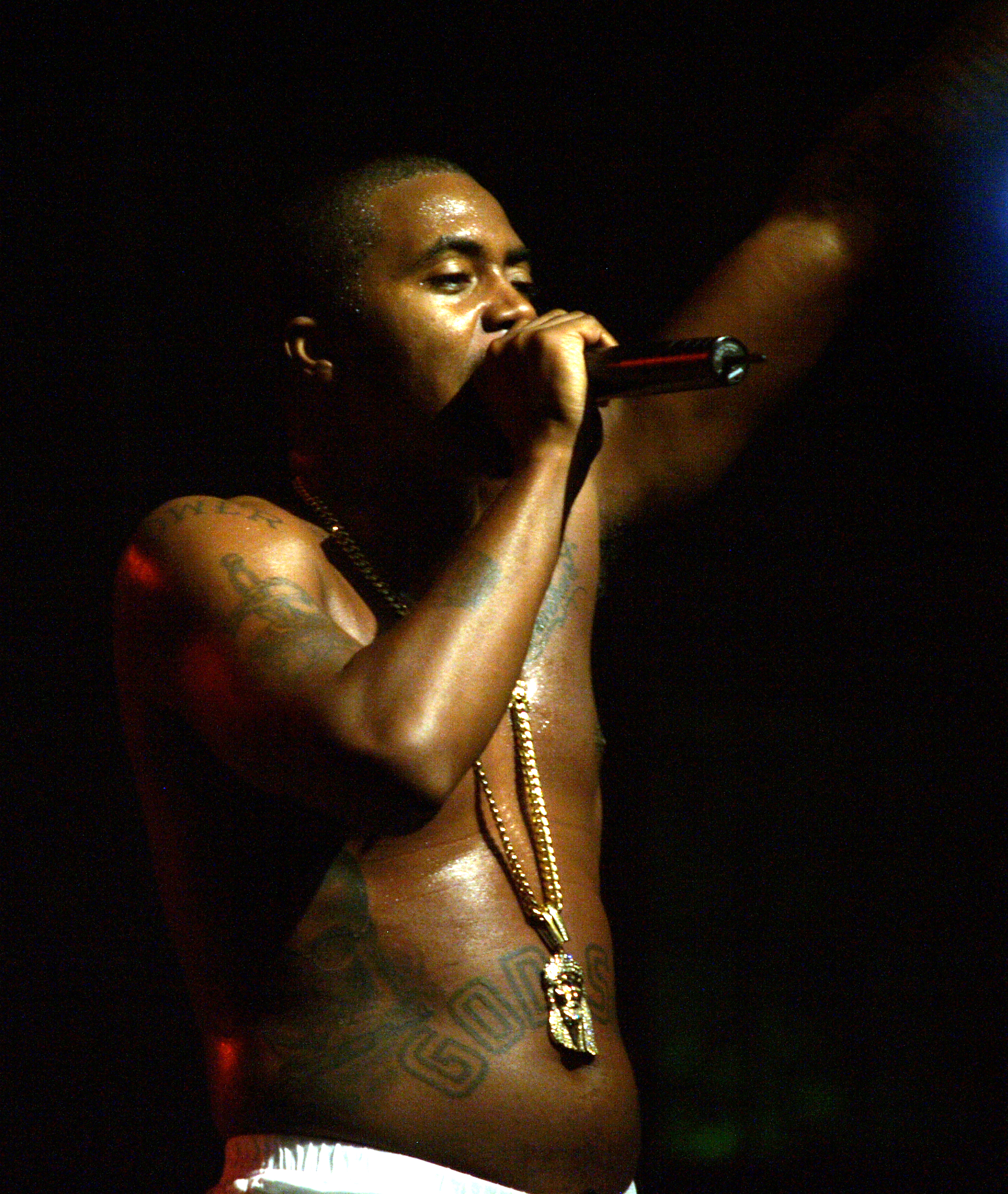
Nas (pictured) is featured on the Track Masters remix, which was released commercially.

"I'm Gonna Be Alright" has a length of three minutes and forty-four seconds (3:44). It was written by Jennifer Lopez, Lorraine Cheryl Cook, Ronald LaPread and the song's producers, Cory Rooney and Troy Oliver. She recorded her vocals for the song at Sony Music Studios in New York City with Robert Williams. The song was later mixed by Tony Maserati and mastered by Ted Jensen at Sterling Sound studios. According to J.Lo's liner notes, the song contains a re-play of elements from the track "8th Wonder" (1980) originally recorded by American hip-hop trio The Sugarhill Gang. Jean-Claude Olivier and Samuel Barnes served as additional writers for the Trackmasters remix single version for the remix album J to tha L–O! The Remixes, with Track Masters serving as producers along with Rooney. It features rapper, Nas. Of working with Nas, Lopez stated: "I love Nas [sic] I've been a fan of his since his first album. I could [recite] all the words by heart. It was just a dream to be able to work with him. He said he would do it and he did it just like that. [Nas and I] shot the video here in Spanish Harlem a few days ago." The remix's beat contains re-adaptions of the instrumental used on Luniz's 1995 song "I Got 5 on It" featuring Michael Marshall, a song which itself sampled Club Nouveau's 1987 song "Why You Treat Me So Bad".

== Controversy ==
"You know what me and Nas we was cool we used to be good [sic] I didn't understand his actions. The first thing that started feeling a little off with him was the Jennifer Lopez shit. I had done a record on the Jennifer Lopez album right and this after I got shot this is the first thing I'm doing trying to come back out. Irv [Gotti] was running around calling everybody and saying don't do business with these guys you do business with him we are not f*cking with you. At the time they were selling records so people weigh there [sic] value by what you can do for them and they were leaning towards Irv and them and they actually took me off the record and put Nas on the record cause she was on Columbia and Nas is on Columbia."

— 50 Cent on the situation.

Controversy ensued over the radio and album versions. Epic Records decided to place Nas on the radio version due to his popularity at the time instead of 50 Cent. 50 Cent became angry at "former" friend Nas. Nas threatened him, stating: "So he's like a kid living in a hip-hop fantasy world. J.Lo is a friend of mine, if she wants to do a record, I'm doing a record with her [sic] 50 was like a little brother to me." In response to 50 Cent's constant slamming of the collaboration, Nas stated: "To sum it all up, 50 is still a new artist. I would say he's got a good five to six more albums before I can really respond to him. With my other battles, it was different. This is not really my thing right here." 50 Cent held no hard feelings towards Lopez, but towards Nas only. According to Epic Records, the switch in artists made on the radio version was "purely business." The 50 Cent-featured version appears on the first American pressings of the J to tha L-O!: The Remixes album (the European version and later US pressings feature a no-rap version) while the Nas-featured version appears on the European pressing of Lopez's 2002 album, This Is Me... Then. The iTunes & Apple Music version only contains a no-rap version, despite the artists title. Of the original song from J.Lo, Tom Sinclair of Entertainment Weekly called the song "upbeat" but noted that: '"I'm Gonna Be Alright' for instance — which is based on the Sugarhill Gang's '8th Wonder' — is attributed to Lopez and eight other writers (presumably making Jen the ninth wonder.)"

== Commercial performance ==
On the week ending April 27, 2002, "I'm Gonna Be Alright" debuted at number 69 on the Billboard Hot 100. The following week, it jumped to 52, and to 36 the next week. On the week ending May 18, it moved three places to 33 on the Hot 100 and the Billboard Hot 100 Airplay chart. On the week ending June 1, it broke the top twenty, shifting 26-18 on the Hot 100 and moving to 20 on the Airplay chart. Two weeks later, it moved 14-11. The following week, "I'm Gonna Be Alright" peaked at number 10 on the Hot 100, becoming Lopez's sixth top-ten hit, and Nas' fourth top-ten. It remained at number 10 for five consecutive weeks. It peaked at 29 on the Canadian Hot 100 and six on the Billboard Pop Songs chart.

The song also achieved considerable success elsewhere. In Australia, "I'm Gonna Be Alright" debuted and peaked at sixteen on July 21, 2002. It was certified Gold by the Australian Recording Industry Association for sales exceeding 35,000 copies. It debuted at number three on the UK Singles Chart, selling nearly 45,000 copies in its first week on the chart. The song peaked at number nine in Belgian Flanders and six in Germany. In Norway, the song debuted at fifteen and peaked at ten. In New Zealand, "I'm Gonna Be Alright" debuted at 46 on the charted date of July 28, 2002, and peaked at 30 for two weeks. In France, the song debuted at 91 on September 14, 2002, and peaked at twelve, having charted for a total of sixteen weeks. Additionally, it entered the top ten in Denmark, Hungary, Netherlands, and Switzerland.

== Music video ==
Lopez and Judd in the music video for "I'm Gonna Be Alright"

Lopez said that the music video of "I'm Gonna Be Alright" was reminiscent of her thriller film, Enough (2002). During the video, she had to leave a relationship with a "baddy". Lopez explained: "The song relates to the movie that's coming out at the same time [sic] It's about being in a relationship that you know is not good for you but you know you're gonna be OK [once you end it]. [The video] is basically about a day in the life of this girl who has this going on in her head. I also wanted the set in a neighborhood that was real and capture the essence of how I grew up. I grew up in the Bronx — it had the same kind of urban, city flavor. [The video captures] all the essences — guys playing dominoes, girls sunning on the side of the street because they don't wanna take the bus to the beach." The music video was shot on April 16 and 17, 2002. The music video for "I'm Gonna Be Alright" was directed by Dave Meyers and filmed in the Bronx, New York City, featuring Nas.

The video begins with the atmosphere of a hot day in Spanish Harlem. Lopez and Nas appear singing in front of a barbed wire fence. Lopez sings in the neighborhood about letting go of a relationship that is not good for her, as the local male residents look on and stare. She appears at a barber shop with her then-husband, Cris Judd, and later at a coin laundry and record shop. She is also playing baseball with men on the street. She later dumps one of her lovers on the street. The clip ends with Lopez winning the baseball game. In 2011, a writer from Daily Express likened the sex appeal from her music video for "On the Floor" to that of "I'm Gonna Be Alright", writing: "[Lopez] once told us in song that 'I’m Gonna Be Alright' and now she’s proved it. The curves she displayed when she recorded the hit video nine years ago have been replaced by a leaner, fitter look."

== Track listings ==
Australian CD single
No.	Title	Length
1.	"I'm Gonna Be Alright" (Track Masters Remix featuring Nas)	2:51
2.	"I'm Gonna Be Alright" (Track Masters remix)	3:14
3.	"Pleasure Is Mine"	4:17
4.	"No Me Ames" (Pablo Flores club remix featuring Marc Anthony)	4:34

US maxi-CD and 12-inch single
No.	Title	Length
1.	"I'm Gonna Be Alright" (Track Masters remix featuring Nas)	2:51
2.	"I'm Gonna Be Alright" (Track Masters remix)	3:14
3.	"I'm Gonna Be Alright" (Track Masters remix instrumental)	3:14
4.	"Alive" (Thunderpuss club mix)	8:51
5.	"Alive" (Thunderpuss Tribe-A-Pella)	7:50

European maxi single
No.	Title	Length
1.	"I'm Gonna Be Alright" (Track Masters remix featuring Nas)	2:51
2.	"I'm Gonna Be Alright" (Track Masters remix)	3:14
3.	"Walking on Sunshine" (Metro remix)	5:49
4.	"I'm Gonna Be Alright" (Track Masters remix featuring Nas [music video])

European 12-inch vinyl
No.	Title	Length
1.	"I'm Gonna Be Alright" (Track Masters remix featuring Nas)	2:51
2.	"I'm Gonna Be Alright" (Track Masters remix)	3:14
3.	"Walking on Sunshine" (Metro Remix)	5:49

== Personnel ==
Personnel are adapted from the liner notes of J.Lo.

- Jennifer Lopez – vocals, songwriting
- Troy Oliver – songwriting, production, drum and keyboard programming
- Cory Rooney – songwriting, production, drum and keyboard programming
- Jose Sanchez – drum and keyboard programming
- Robert Williams – vocal production, vocal recording engineer
- David Swope – assistant recording engineer
- Tony Maserati – mixing
- Peter Wade Keusch – assistant mixing
- Ted Jensen – mixing
- Shelene Thomas – backing vocals

== Charts ==
=== Weekly charts ===
Chart (2002)	Peak position
Australia (ARIA)	16
Australian Urban (ARIA)	5
Austria (Ö3 Austria Top 40)	25
Belgium (Ultratop 50 Flanders)	9
Belgium (Ultratop 50 Wallonia)	26
Canada (Nielsen SoundScan)	29
Canada Radio (Nielsen BDS)	70
Canada CHR/Top 40 (Nielsen BDS)	34
Denmark (Tracklisten)	9
Europe (Eurochart Hot 100)	5
Finland (Suomen virallinen lista)	18
France (SNEP)	12
Germany (GfK)	6
Greece (IFPI)	13
Hungary (Single Top 40)	8
Ireland (IRMA)	13
Italy (FIMI)	24
Netherlands (Dutch Top 40)	9
Netherlands (Single Top 100)	10
New Zealand (Recorded Music NZ)	30
Norway (VG-lista)	10
Poland (PiF PaF)	15
Romania (Romanian Top 100)	59
Scottish Singles Sales (Official Charts)	11
Sweden (Sverigetopplistan)	22
Switzerland (Schweizer Hitparade)	4
UK Singles (Official Charts)	3
UK Hip Hop/R&B (Official Charts)	1
UK Indie (Official Charts)	47
US Billboard Hot 100	10
US Hot R&B/Hip-Hop Songs (Billboard)	32
US Pop Airplay (Billboard)	6
US Rhythmic Airplay (Billboard)	5

=== Year-end charts ===
Chart (2002)	Position
Australia (ARIA)	77
Belgium (Ultratop 50 Flanders)	49
Europe (Eurochart Hot 100)	72
Germany (Media Control)	58
Netherlands (Dutch Top 40)	10
Netherlands (Single Top 100)	55
Switzerland (Schweizer Hitparade)	16
UK Singles (OCC)	68
UK Urban (Music Week)	28
US Billboard Hot 100	29
US Mainstream Top 40 (Billboard)	31
US Rhythmic Top 40 (Billboard)	13

== Certifications ==
Region	Certification	Certified units/sales
Australia (ARIA)	Gold	35,000^{^}
United Kingdom (BPI)	Silver	200,000^{‡}
^{^} Shipments figures based on certification alone.^{‡} Sales+streaming figures based on certification alone.

== Release history ==
Release dates and formats
Region	Date	Format(s)	Version(s)	Label(s)	Ref.
United States	April 1, 2002	Rhythmic contemporary radio	Solo	Epic	
United States	April 15, 2002	Rhythmic contemporary radio; urban contemporary radio	Nas	Epic	
United States	April 22, 2002	Contemporary hit radio	Nas	Epic	
Germany	July 1, 2002	CD	Various	Sony	
United Kingdom	July 1, 2002	12-inch vinyl; CD; cassette	Various	Epic	
Australia	July 8, 2002	CD	Solo	Sony	
United States	July 30, 2002	12-inch vinyl; maxi CD (with "Alive")	Solo; Nas	Epic	
