= Bell and James =

US musical group

- Origin: Philadelphia, Pennsylvania, United States
- Years active: 1978–1981
- Label: A&M Records
- Past members: LeRoy Bell; Casey James

Bell and James were an American soul group from Philadelphia, Pennsylvania! formed by LeRoy Bell (drums, guitar) and Casey James (guitar, bass, keyboards).

== Career ==
Both LeRoy Bell and Casey James had played in Special Blend before beginning to write songs together. Bell's uncle Thom Bell got them signed to Gamble & Huff as songwriters for Philadelphia International Records. The duo wrote sings for Elton John, MFSB, The O'Jays, Gladys Knight & the Pips, Freda Payne, Phyllis Hyman, the Three Degrees, and others, before A&M Records took notice and signed the duo to a full album deal in 1978.

Three albums and several hit singles followed, including "Livin' It Up (Friday Night)", which hit No. 7 on the Billboard R&B singles chart and No. 15 on the Billboard Hot 100 in 1979. It sold over one million copies in the U.S., plus the same track reached No. 59 in the UK Singles Chart.

== Discography ==
=== Albums ===
Year	Title	Label	U.S. R&B Albums	U.S. Pop Albums
1978	Bell & James	A&M Records	17	31
1979	Only Make Believe	A&M Records	36	125
1981	In Black and White	A&M Records		

=== Singles ===
Year	Title	Chart positions	
Year	Title	U.S. Hot 100	U.S. R&B Singles
1979	"Livin' It Up (Friday Night)"	15	7
1979	"Shakedown"	-	65
1979	"You Never Know What You've Got"	-	54
1980	"Only Make Believe"	-	50
