= Alive (Jennifer Lopez song) =

Single by Jennifer Lopez

from the album J to tha L–O! The Remixes
- A-side: "I'm Gonna Be Alright (Track Masters Remix)"
- Released: April 29, 2002
- Studio: Sony Music Studios; The Hit Factory (New York City)
- Genre: Pop; R&B
- Length: 4:41
- Label: Epic
- Songwriters: Jennifer Lopez; Cris Judd; Cory Rooney
- Producers: Cory Rooney; Dan Shea

Jennifer Lopez singles chronology
"I'm Gonna Be Alright" (Track Masters Remix) (2002)	"Alive" (2002)	"Jenny from the Block" (2002)

Music video
- "Alive" on YouTube

"Alive" is a song recorded by American entertainer Jennifer Lopez. It was written by Lopez, Cris Judd, and Cory Rooney for the Michael Apted-directed thriller, Enough (2002). Lopez stars in the film as Slim, a waitress who marries a wealthy contractor, and flees with their 5 year old daughter as he becomes increasingly abusive. While on the run, Slim, who discovers that her husband is following her, "trains herself for a final, violent confrontation". The producers of Enough wanted Lopez to write a new song for film, however, she felt as if it was not something that could be forced. In October 2001, while on their honeymoon, Judd played her a melody that he had written on the piano. Lopez thought that the melody was "really beautiful", and that it would be perfect fit for Enough. She incorporated the hardships that Slim went through in the film, as well as her own personal struggles, into the song's lyrics.

"Alive" does not appear on the film score of Enough, and instead was included as the sole original song on Lopez's first remix album, J to tha L–O! The Remixes (2002). It was serviced to radio in the United States on April 29, 2002, by Epic Records. The song was released commercially on a 12" vinyl as a double A-side along with "I'm Gonna Be Alright (Track Masters Remix)" on July 30, 2002. Music critics were divided on "Alive"; some deemed Lopez's change in musical style to be refreshing, while others felt as if she should stick to the dance arrangements of her previous work. The song's accompanying music video was directed by Jim Gable. It features Lopez playing the piano, writing the lyrics to "Alive" and recording the song, intercut between scenes from Enough. While the song failed to appear on any national charts, it did reach number two on the US Billboard Dance Music/Club Play Singles chart. Lopez performed the song live for the first and only time on The Oprah Winfrey Show on May 17, 2002.

== Background ==
It was first reported in November 2000 that Jennifer Lopez was in talks to star in the Michael Apted-directed thriller Enough. Sandra Bullock had originally signed on to portray the lead, but was forced to back out of the film due to scheduling conflicts. Lopez's casting in the film was confirmed by MTV News on May 19, 2001. Filming began two days later and took place on location in Los Angeles, San Francisco, and Seattle. Recording music and filming Enough at the same time, Lopez became overworked and had a nervous breakdown. She suffered from a lack of sleep and froze up in her trailer. In 2008, Lopez confessed: "I was like – I don't want to move, I don't want to talk, I don't want to do anything".

Lopez stars in Enough as Slim, a waitress whose life is severely altered after she marries Mitch, a wealthy contractor portrayed by Billy Campbell. She flees her increasingly abusive husband with their daughter following her birth. Slim soon discovers that she is being followed by Mitch. While on the run, she "trains herself for a final, violent confrontation" with her husband. For the final act, which required Lopez to "become a believable lean, mean fighting machine", she considered learning tai chi or taekwondo, but was worried about learning it at an expert level in a short period of time. Her personal trainer then suggested that she study Krav Maga, the "official self-defense system of the Israeli Defense Forces which has recently become trendy in the States", according to MTV News. Enough was initially scheduled to be released in September 2001, but was later pushed back to "early 2002" and eventually saw a release on May 24, 2002.

== Writing and production ==
"Alive" (2002)
A 25 second sample of "Alive", described by Lopez as a downtempo "sweet, string-laden" ballad. This song also features pianos and pop drum beats

The producers of Enough wanted Lopez to write a new song for the film. According to the entertainer, writing a song is something that cannot be forced; "It kinda just has to happen". While on their honeymoon in October 2001, her then-husband Cris Judd played her a melody that he had written on the piano. Lopez thought that the melody was "really beautiful" and that it would make a "wonderful song". She felt that a "little bit of it sounded like the movie, a little haunting". When she heard the melody, she said to herself: "I can write something to that right now. And we can use it in Enough". Lopez then began to think about the film and the character that she portrays and what she had been through. She also thought about the things that she had gone through in her own life. According to Lopez, it was easy to be inspired by the melody Judd had written, "and just kind of that grateful feeling, to just be here [...] And keeping it simple. Because life can get so crazy and everything. And then you realize, it's all just kinda about the simplicity of being here, and being healthy. And being alive. So that's where the song came from".

"Alive" was written by Lopez, Judd and her frequent collaborator Cory Rooney. The song was produced by Rooney and Dan Shea, who also provided programming for the song. Lopez's vocals were recorded at Sony Music Studios and The Hit Factory in New York City. Her vocals were engineered by Robert Williams, with assistance from Jamie Gudewicz, Jason Dale and Kyle White. Pat Webe acted as the stage engineer for the song. Humberto Gatica provided audio engineering for the strings, which were arranged and conducted by Bill Ross. They were recorded by Bill Smith at Sony Pictures Studios in Culver City, with assistance from Jason Lloyd, Mark Eshelman and Julianne Masted. "Alive" was mixed by Mick Guzauski at Barking Doctor Studios in Mount Kisco, with assistance from Tom Bender. The song was mastered by Herb Powers at Hit Factory Mastering in New York City. After the song was completed, Lopez played it for the producers of Enough and they "loved it".

"Alive" is not "the type of music" that the singer is used to making. According to Lopez, she knew that there was something "inside of me that I have to offer to this ["Alive"]. And then, you know, things happen. Things have a weird way of happening naturally and organically when they're supposed to. And I feel that this song was just meant to be, for this movie. Basically, I wrote the song for me to go through all these kinds of things as an actress with this character. You draw from all different experiences in your life. From way back to the present, to whatever, to make it really true and honest". "Alive" means "the world" to Lopez because of its positive message and the fact that it was something that she created with Judd.

== Release and promotion ==
Lopez writing the lyrics to "Alive" while scenes from Enough are displayed in the background.

"Alive" was serviced to radio in the United States on May 21, 2002, as the third single from J to tha L–O! The Remixes. The song was released commercially on a 12" vinyl as a double A-side along with "I'm Gonna Be Alright" on July 30, 2002. Chris Cox and Barry Harris, known collectively as Thunderpuss, remixed "Alive" into a "club-ready" dance track. The song managed to reach number two on the US Billboard Dance Music/Club Play Singles chart, staying behind "You Gotta Believe" by Tommy Boy Silver. It topped the Maxi-Single Sales chart for three weeks. The song also managed to reach number 18 on the Adult Contemporary chart. At the 2003 Billboard Latin Music Awards the Thunderpuss Remix of "Alive" received an award for Latin Dance Single of the Year and Latin Dance Club Play Track of the Year.

The accompanying music video for "Alive" was directed by Jim Gable and edited by Scott C. Wilson. The video opens with Lopez composing the melody and writing the lyrics for "Alive" on a piano in her living room, which overlooks a pier. Behind her, a flashing screen displays scenes from Enough, along with Lopez recording the song in a studio with her band. After walking away from the piano, she lies optimistically on her sofa. She is then seen singing amid a large body of outdoor water. At the instrumental passage for "Alive", Lopez embraces the music being played by the band and changes a few chords with Rooney, who is seated at a piano. She then emotionally finishes recording the song during its final chorus. Throughout the entire video, clips from the film continue to be inter cut with these settings. The music video for "Alive" was included on a special edition DVD re-release of Enough, as well as Lopez's first music video compilation The Reel Me (2003). Lopez performed the song for the first and only time on The Oprah Winfrey Show on May 17, 2002.

== Critical reception ==
Music critics were divided on "Alive". Chuck Taylor of Billboard stated that: "Remember that 'Oh, my' feeling the first time you heard Madonna sing her first ballad, 'Crazy for You'? It's déjà vu with 'Alive'." According to Taylor, Lopez instills a "vulnerable spirit of romanticism" in the track. He wrote that Lopez "does her best" with the song, a "regal ballad". He called "Alive" a "bold new terrain" for Lopez, "an artist who is heralded more for her videogenics than her voice." Taylor wrote that "it's nice to have top 40's leading staple artist diversify her portfolio with a musical summer fling that will maintain programmers' and fans' love affair with Lopez". He stated that the radio remix of "Alive" is "made more luxurious" with the addition of a "cascade of fluttering strings".

Sal Cinquemani of Slant Magazine called "Alive" the "biggest surprise" of J to tha L–O! The Remixes. William Ruhlmann of Allmusic gave the song a negative review, writing that her vocal limitations "come to the fore when she is spotlighted on such a song without a dance arrangement to support her". He stated, however, that her vocal limitations are not "as big a deal" as her lack of emotional involvement: "Though she tries to fake it here and there, she still sounds like she's singing her grocery list instead of the song's clichéd lyrics". David Browne of Entertainment Weekly called the song a "syrupy ballad" that is "neither alive nor a remix". He stated that if you listen to the song long enough, "you may actually be conned into thinking Lopez's voice and songs are passable". He concluded by stating as a result of "Alive", J to tha L–O! The Remixes may be the most insidious album ever made.

== Track listings ==
- UK CD promo single
1. "Alive" (Album Version) – 4:41
2. "Alive" (Thunderpuss Radio Mix) – 4:12
- US CD promo single
1. "Alive" (Radio Remix) – 4:20
2. "Alive" (Album Version) – 4:41
- US 12" promo vinyl
1. "Alive" (Thunderpuss Club Mix) – 8:51
2. "Alive" (Thunderpuss Tribe-A-Pella) – 7:50
3. "Alive" (Thunderpuss Radio Mix) – 4:12
- US 12" vinyl
1. "I'm Gonna Be Alright" (Track Masters Remix) featuring Nas – 2:51
2. "I'm Gonna Be Alright" (Track Masters Remix) – 3:14
3. "I'm Gonna Be Alright" (Track Masters Remix Instrumental) – 3:14
4. "Alive" (Thunderpuss Club Mix) – 8:51
5. "Alive" (Thunderpuss Tribe-A-Pella) – 7:50

== Credits and personnel ==
Credits adapted from the liner notes of J to tha L–O! The Remixes.

Locations

- Vocals recorded at Sony Music Studios and The Hit Factory in New York City, New York.
- Strings recorded at Sony Pictures Studios in Culver City, California.
- Mixed at Barking Doctor Studios in Mount Kisco, New York.
- Mastered at Hit Factory Mastering in New York City, New York.

Personnel

- Jennifer Lopez — songwriter
- Cris Judd — songwriter
- Cory Rooney — producer, songwriter
- Dan Shea — producer, programmer
- Robert Williams — engineer
- Jamie Gudewicz — assistance engineer
- Jason Dale — assistance engineer
- Kyle White — assistance engineer
- Pat Webe — stage engineer
- Humberto Gatica — string engineer
- Bill Ross — string engineer and conductor
- Bill Smith — string recorder
- Jason Lloy — assistant string recorder
- Mark Eshelman — assistant string recorder
- Julianne Masted — assistant string recorder
- Mick Guzauski — mixer
- Tom Bender — assistant mixer
- Herb Powers — mastering

== Charts ==
Chart (2002)	Peak position
US Adult Contemporary (Billboard)	18
US Dance Club Songs (Billboard) Thunderpuss Remix	2
US Dance Singles Sales (Billboard) Thunderpuss Remix	1
US Tropical Airplay (Billboard)	36

== Release history ==
Release dates and formats
Region	Date	Format(s)	Label(s)	Ref.
United States	April 29, 2002	Adult contemporary radio; hot adult contemporary radio	Epic	
United States	July 30, 2002	12-inch vinyl; maxi CD (Note: with "I'm Gonna Be Alright (Track Masters Remix)")	Epic	
