= Ain't It Funny (Murder Remix) =

2002 single by Jennifer Lopez

"Ain't It Funny" (Murder Remix)

Single by Jennifer Lopez featuring Ja Rule and Caddillac Tah

from the album J to tha L–O! The Remixes and Irv Gotti Presents: The Inc.
- Released: January 7, 2002
- Recorded: September 2001
- Studio: Sony Muic (New York City)
- Genre: Hip hop; R&B
- Length: 3:54
- Label: Epic
- Songwriters: Jennifer Lopez; Cory Rooney; Irving Lorenzo; Jeffrey Atkins; Tiheem Crocker; Ashanti Douglas; Craig Mack
- Producers: Irv Gotti; 7; Cory Rooney

Jennifer Lopez singles chronology
| "I'm Real" (Murder Remix) (2001) | "Ain't It Funny" (Murder Remix) (2002) | "I'm Gonna Be Alright" (Track Masters Remix) (2002) |

Ja Rule singles chronology
| "Always on Time" (2001) | "Ain't It Funny (Murder Remix)" (2002) | "What's Luv?" (2002) |

Music video
- "Ain't It Funny" (Murder Remix) on YouTube

"Ain't It Funny (Murder Remix)" is a song by American singer Jennifer Lopez for her remix album J to tha L–O! The Remixes (2002). The song was marketed as a remix of "Ain't It Funny" but is actually an entirely different song with the same title. It features guest vocals from Ja Rule (Jeffrey Atkins) and Caddillac Tah (Tiheem Crocker). It was written by Lopez, Atkins, Tah, Cory Rooney, Irving Lorenzo, and Ashanti. Over a reworking of the beat to Craig Mack's "Flava in Ya Ear" (produced by Easy Mo Bee), Lopez sings about "dropping a boyfriend who keeps messing up".

== Background ==
In July 2001, Jennifer Lopez's number-one album J.Lo (2001) was reissued with a Murder Inc. remix of one of its original singles, "I'm Real". The R&B Murder remix of "I'm Real" was written by Ja Rule, who also features on the track. According to Rule, he initially was "just f[uck]ing around" with the track after Lopez's team gave it to him to remix, but it turned out to be "a hell of a record". This version was successful, topping the Billboard Hot 100 chart for several weeks. It also helped J.Lo to return to the top ten of the US Billboard 200 album chart.

The song allowed Lopez to crossover from pop to R&B. Rule said this put her in "another zone" and her fans were not "gonna want the pop version of J. Lo no more, they gonna want the 'I'm Real' version". The rapper enjoyed working with Lopez and called it a "real collaboration" because he actually worked with her in the studio. The success of "I'm Real (Murder Remix)" lead him to begin working on a new version of "Ain't It Funny" the following August, which would later be announced as the lead single to J.Lo's remix album, J to tha L–O! The Remixes, in December 2001.

== Writing and production ==
Rooney explained: "We had changed the sound of Jennifer Lopez [with "I'm Real"] and we didn't have anything else on the [J.Lo] album we could release as a single. We had to do another remix to keep the momentum going." Then-upcoming artist Ashanti dropped by Irv Gotti's studio in New York. She recalled: "Everyone was there and Ja [Rule] was on the floor playing video games, and they had the beat playing in the background. Chris Gotti, Irv Gotti's brother, said 'Ja's supposed to be writing this record for J-Lo, but it doesn't look like he's going to be doing anything tonight. Why don't you go in there and see what's happening?' So that's exactly what I did." Ashanti wrote two verses and recorded a demo for the new version of "Ain't It Funny" for Lopez. Gotti and 7 flew out to Los Angeles on September 10, 2001, to record the song with Lopez. The song was due to be recorded the following day, but was postponed due to the September 11 attacks. When work resumed on the song, Gotti called Ashanti from Los Angeles asking her to write another verse for the song. She recalled: "I had to write it over the phone and two-way Irv the lyrics." After showing P. Diddy the song sampling "Flava in Ya Ear", Gotti paid $500,000 for sample clearance of the record.

== Composition and critical response ==
"Ain't it Funny (Murder Remix)" is a hip hop song with a duration of three minutes and forty-nine seconds (3:49). It is thematically dissimilar to the original track. While he was working towards the remix, Ja Rule boasted "I'm about to f--- ya'll up," stating that the song's sampling of Craig Mack's "Flava in Ya Ear" would be "remixed" and "vamped up crazy". He said "It's totally not J. Lo." Over the reworking of the "Flava In Ya Ear" beat, Lopez sings about "a boyfriend who keeps messing up," while Rule and Cadillac Tah "drop rhymes" on the track. Rule raps that he's "Off the wall like MJ in his early days," which is a reference to Michael Jackson's album Off the Wall (1979). The rapper also says "Oh I, never been a sucker for chocha," chocha meaning pussy, the slang term for vagina. He continues on to say that people "want" him after they see him "workin' with money," meaning working with Lopez.

While reviewing the original "Ain't It Funny", Billboard's Chuck Taylor said of the remix release, "Sony has got to be kidding, calling it "Ain't it Funny" when not one note of it is held in common with the original. It's a disturbing trend, but one that will surely push J.Lo to a new high."

== Commercial performance ==
"Ain't it Funny" was released to appeal to not only pop but "street-leaning" outlets. For the week ending December 29, 2001, "Ain't it Funny" debuted at number 74 on the Billboard Hot 100. It also debuted at number 75 on the Hot 100 Airplay. In its second week, the song jumped to number 53 on the Hot 100 and 56 on the Airplay chart. The following week, "Ain't it Funny" broke the top 40 of the Hot 100 and the Airplay chart. After its fourth week, the song progressed to number 16 on the Billboard Hot 100, winning the chart's "Greatest Airplay Gainer" title of the week, having jumped to number 17 at the Airplay chart that week. For the week ending February 9, 2002, "Ain't it Funny" jumped from number 12 to ten on the Hot 100 and Airplay chart, making it Lopez's fifth top-ten hit at the time. This week, it once again won the "Greatest Airplay Gainer" title. The next week, again claiming the "Greatest Airplay Gainer" title, the song jumped to number four on both charts, while also entering the top ten of Billboard's Hot Dance Club Play chart at number eight.

After remaining in the top five of both charts for another three weeks, "Ain't it Funny" peaked at number one on the Hot 100 and Airplay for the week ending March 9, 2002. This week, the single's parent album J to tha L–O! The Remixes returned to number one on the Billboard 200 with sales of 102,000 units, giving her simultaneous number ones. Also this week, the album had reached number five on the magazine's Top R&B/Hip Hop Albums chart while "Ain't it Funny" had reached the same position on the Top R&B/Hip-Hop Tracks chart. Additionally, the song unseated the track "Always On Time" at the summit of the Hot 100, which was coincidentally by Ja Rule featuring Ashanti, two people who worked with Lopez on the remix. For five weeks, "Ain't it Funny" remained at number one on the Hot 100 and Airplay chart, before dropping to number three on both charts for the week ending April 20, 2002. The song peaked at number three on the R&B/Hip-Hop Tracks Chart.

The Murder Remix for "Ain't it Funny" attained moderate success internationally. In the United Kingdom, it peaked at number four, becoming her seventh top-ten hit there. The remix entered the Swiss Singles Chart at number 16 for the week of March 17, 2002. Three weeks later, it peaked at number seven, where it remained for an additional week. "Ain't it Funny" also peaked at number seven in The Netherlands for the week ending March 30, 2002. In total, it spent five weeks in the top ten on the Dutch Singles Chart. The song entered the top twenty in Belgium Flanders, Spain and Denmark.

== Music video ==
The single's official music video was directed by Cris Judd. The music video features two parts that frequently interchange back and forth throughout the song. The first part of the video shows Lopez having a small party in her home with guests including Ja Rule and Ashanti. This part of the video is from the point of view of the guy who is being mentioned in the song. His face is not seen, and Lopez addresses the camera throughout this section of the video. This section begins with the guy knocking on the door, Lopez inviting him in, and then eventually showing him the door when she sees him attempting to look/flirt with other women at the party. As he leaves, she goes on entertaining the other guests. The second part of the video involves scenes with Lopez, Ja Rule and Cadillac Tah in a white room, Ja Rule in a recording studio in Lopez's home, Lopez sitting in a chair singing bits of the song, and Lopez and Ja Rule singing the parts of the final verse against a gold backdrop.

== Accolades ==
Teen Choice Awards
| Year | Award | Nominated work | Result | Ref. |
|---|---|---|---|---|
| 2002 | Choice Music: Single | Ain't It Funny (Murder Remix) | Nominated | |
| 2002 | Choice Music: Hook-Up | Ain't It Funny (Murder Remix) | Nominated | |
| 2002 | Choice Music: R&B/Hip-Hop Track | Ain't It Funny (Murder Remix) | Won | |

== Track listings ==
- European CD single
1. "Ain't It Funny" (Murder Remix featuring Ja Rule and Caddillac Tah) – 3:54
2. "Play" (Artful Dodger mix) – 4:35
- European maxi-CD and UK CD single
1. "Ain't It Funny" (Murder Remix featuring Ja Rule and Caddillac Tah) – 3:54
2. "Play" (Artful Dodger mix) – 4:35
3. "Feelin' So Good" (HQ2 club mix) – 7:25
4. "Ain't It Funny" (remix featuring Ja Rule—video) – 3:36
- European and UK 12-inch single
1. "Ain't It Funny" (Murder Remix featuring Ja Rule and Caddillac Tah) – 3:54
2. "Ain't It Funny" (Murder Remix featuring Ja Rule instrumental) – 3:54
3. "Waiting for Tonight" (Hex's Momentous club mix) – 11:17
- UK cassette single
1. "Ain't It Funny" (Murder Remix featuring Ja Rule and Caddillac Tah) – 3:54
2. "Feelin' So Good" (HQ2 radio mix) – 4:05
3. "Play" (Artful Dodger mix) – 4:35
- Australian CD single
1. "Ain't It Funny" (Murder Remix featuring Ja Rule and Caddillac Tah)
2. "Waiting for Tonight" (Hex Hector vocal remix extended)
3. "Feelin' So Good" (HQ2 club mix)
4. "Ain't It Funny" (Almighty mix)

== Charts ==
=== Weekly charts ===
| Chart (2002) | Peak position |
|---|---|
| Australia (ARIA) | 9 |
| Australian Urban (ARIA) | 3 |
| Belgium (Ultratop 50 Flanders) | 16 |
| Belgium (Ultratop 50 Wallonia) | 24 |
| Canada (Nielsen SoundScan) | 12 |
| Canada Radio (Nielsen BDS) | 6 |
| Canada CHR/Top 40 (Nielsen BDS) | 3 |
| Denmark (Tracklisten) | 19 |
| Europe (Eurochart Hot 100) | 13 |
| Germany (GfK) | 18 |
| Greece (IFPI) | 22 |
| Hungary (Rádiós Top 40) | 21 |
| Hungary (Single Top 40) | 14 |
| Netherlands (Dutch Top 40) | 10 |
| Netherlands (Single Top 100) | 7 |
| Scottish Singles Sales (Official Charts) | 6 |
| Spain (Promusicae) | 16 |
| Switzerland (Schweizer Hitparade) | 7 |
| UK Singles (Official Charts) | 4 |
| UK Hip Hop/R&B (Official Charts) | 2 |
| US Billboard Hot 100 | 1 |
| US Dance Club Songs (Billboard) | 8 |
| US Hot R&B/Hip-Hop Songs (Billboard) | 4 |
| US Pop Airplay (Billboard) | 1 |
| US Rhythmic Airplay (Billboard) | 1 |

=== Year-end charts ===
| Chart (2002) | Position |
|---|---|
| Australia (ARIA) | 94 |
| Brazil (Crowley) | 27 |
| Canada (Nielsen SoundScan) | 105 |
| Canada Radio (Nielsen BDS) | 23 |
| Ireland (IRMA) | 50 |
| Netherlands (Dutch Top 40) | 72 |
| Netherlands (Single Top 100) | 74 |
| Switzerland (Schweizer Hitparade) | 57 |
| UK Singles (OCC) | 54 |
| UK Airplay (Music Week) | 45 |
| UK Urban (Music Week) | 16 |
| US Billboard Hot 100 | 13 |
| US Hot R&B/Hip-Hop Singles & Tracks (Billboard) | 34 |
| US Mainstream Top 40 (Billboard) | 8 |
| US Rhythmic Top 40 (Billboard) | 6 |

=== Decade-end charts ===
| Chart (2000–2009) | Position |
|---|---|
| US Billboard Hot 100 | 62 |

== Certifications ==
| Region | Certification | Certified units/sales |
|---|---|---|
| Australia (ARIA) | Gold | 35,000^{^} |
^{^} Shipments figures based on certification alone.

== Release history ==
| Region | Date | Format(s) | Label | Ref. |
|---|---|---|---|---|
| United States | January 7, 2002 | Rhythmic contemporary radio; urban radio | Epic | |
| United States | February 28, 2002 | 12-inch vinyl | Epic | |
| Germany | March 4, 2002 | CD | Epic | |
| United Kingdom | March 11, 2002 | 12-inch vinyl; CD; cassette | Epic | |
| Australia | April 15, 2002 | CD | Epic | |
