= I'm Real (Murder Remix) =

Single by Jennifer Lopez featuring Ja Rule

from the album J.Lo (reissue) and J to tha L–O! The Remixes
- Released: September 4, 2001
- Recorded: 2001
- Genre: Hip-hop; R&B
- Length: 4:21
- Label: Epic
- Songwriters: Jeffrey Atkins; 7 Aurelius; Irving Lorenzo; Jennifer Lopez; Troy Oliver; Cory Rooney; Leshan Lewis; Rick James
- Producers: Irv Gotti; Ja Rule

Jennifer Lopez singles chronology
"Ain't It Funny" (2001)	"I'm Real (Murder Remix)" (2001)	"Ain't It Funny (Murder Remix)" (2002)

Ja Rule singles chronology
"I Cry" (2001)	"I'm Real (Murder Remix)" (2001)	"Livin' It Up" (2001)

Music video
- "I'm Real" (Murder Remix) on YouTube

"I'm Real (Murder Remix)" is a song recorded by the American singer Jennifer Lopez, featuring Ja Rule, for the reissue of Lopez's second studio album J.Lo (2001). It was subsequently included Ja Rule's third studio album Pain Is Love (2001). The song received mixed reviews for its lyrics. However, it has been appreciated for the use of samples. "I'm Real (Murder Remix)" was released as the lead single from Lopez's first remix album J to tha L–O! The Remixes (2002) on September 4, 2001, by Epic Records, while the original "I'm Real" was simultaneously released as the fourth and final single from J.Lo.

"I'm Real (Murder Remix)" topped the U.S. Billboard Hot 100 for five non-consecutive weeks, beginning September 8, 2001, and also topped the Hot 100 Airplay chart. It also reached the top 10 in twelve other countries. It was the fifth-bestselling song of 2001 in the US. Considerable controversy followed the song after its release, and was the cause of a rule change to the Billboard charts. A music video was made for the track, with the video featuring Ja Rule and Irv Gotti.

== Background and release ==
Urban radio stations were disappointed that J. Lo had not produced a single that catered to their audiences, and Epic Records knew that they needed the support of both urban and pop radio. After the album began to decline on the charts, Rooney suggested to Tommy Mottola that the song be remixed, which prompted Mottola to enlist Ja Rule of Murder Inc. Records. Ja Rule admitted that he was "thrown" when he heard the song, saying: "I don't do dance music, so what do you want me to do to this?" Though initially enlisted to remix the song, he decided to write a new song with the same title instead, saying: "OK, I don't need to hear that, scratch that, 'cause we're gonna do our own thing" after hearing the original track. Along with Irv Gotti, Ja Rule wrote the Murder remix for "I'm Real", which utilizes samples from "All Night Long" (1983) by Mary Jane Girls and "Mary Jane" by Rick James. "I'm Real (Murder remix)" was produced by Gotti and 7 Aurelius, and was recorded at Record Plant in Hollywood, California and Crackhouse Studios in New York City. Singer Ashanti recorded the demo version of the remix, and provided background vocals for the final version. Ja Rule opens the remix by screaming "What's my motherfucking name?", to which Lopez responds "R-U-L-E". However, these lyrics resulted in common confusion among listeners, with many having heard "Are you Ellie?" instead.

J.Lo was reissued on July 24, 2001 (Lopez's thirty-second birthday), now containing "I'm Real (Murder Remix)".

Following the release of "I'm Real (Murder Remix)", Lopez's personal sound had shifted away from a pure pop sound to more of an R&B/hip-hop sound. Ja Rule noted that her audience now wanted a different sound from her, "It's J. Lo now because of 'I'm Real' [...] It's gonna put her in another zone. After this one, they gonna be expecting hot crossover R&B joints from J. Lo. They ain't gonna want the pop version of J. Lo no more, they gonna want the 'I'm Real' version." Rule described it as a "real collaboration" by saying "Sometimes when you do a collaboration with an artist it's not real collaborations [...] 'Send me a reel here. I'll fly it back here.' Me and J. Lo's record was a real collaboration."

== Critical response ==
"I'm Real (Murder Remix)" received favorable reviews from music critics. William Ruhlmann of AllMusic picked the song as one of the best from the album, while Sal Cinquemani of Slant Magazine called it "edgy, often sexy remix", naming it "a significant departure from the retro-hued album version". Ian Wade of Yahoo! Music wrote that "only the Ja Rule assisted 'I'm Real' and 'Ain't It Funny', that makes something vaguely special out of the original versions, Jen'd be better off just hooking up with him for good and they could become a Cristal-sipping, foulmouthed and bling-blinging Sonny & Cher." While reviewing Ja Rule's Pain Is Love album, Soren Baker of Los Angeles Times noted "I'm Real" to be "one of the album's stronger songs, as Rule's rough voice and Lopez's sugary tones make a surprisingly appealing blend". In 2011, the remix version was named the sixth-biggest duet of all time by Billboard.

== Chart performance ==
Despite being two different songs, "I'm Real" and "I'm Real (Murder Remix)" were not treated separately by most charts. The success of "I'm Real (Murder Remix)", which became the biggest hit of Lopez's career at the time, propelled the album J.Lo from number 90 on the Billboard 200 back to the top ten according to Nielsen SoundScan. The chart position of the Murder remix was boosted by radio play of the album track, which led to complaints of unfairness and change of Billboard policy in 2002. Afterwards, airplay of identically named songs but with substantially different melodies was not combined when computing chart positions. Rooney stated that the song's success "really pissed off everybody in terms of Billboard's rules". Following the release of "Ain't It Funny (Murder Remix)", Chuck Taylor of Billboard noted: "Sony has got to be kidding, calling it "Ain't it Funny" when not one note of it is held in common with the original", calling it a "disturbing trend".

"I'm Real (Murder Remix)" was a staple on R&B/hip-hop and pop radio during the summer and fall of 2001, spending fifteen weeks in the top five of the Billboard Hot 100. In 2009 the single was named the 30th most successful song of the 2000s, on the Billboard Hot 100 Songs of the Decade.

== Accolades ==
Accolades for "I'm Real (Murder Remix)"
Year	Awards	Category	Result	Ref
2002	Billboard Latin Music Awards	Latin Dance Maxi-Single of the Year	Nominated	
2002	MTV Video Music Awards	Best Hip-Hop Video	Won	

== Music video ==
The music video for "I'm Real (Murder Remix)" was directed by Dave Meyers. The music video features a variety of settings including a dilapidated house, swimming pool and basketball court. Meyers stated that: "I was really up to capturing the less polished version of the two. The Murder Inc. crew at that time was all about having a good time, and I think Jennifer certainly was infected by that energy as well." Ja Rule described the process of making the remix and filming the video as a "the fastest turnaround probably ever for a record. From the time the record was written to video, it was a two-day spin. It was done that fast." The pink velour Juicy Couture tracksuit worn by Lopez in the Murder remix video became iconic according to Vogue. CNN's Marianna Cerini noted that the tracksuit "created a craze -- and one of the most ubiquitous looks of the decade", with Vogue crediting the music video with putting Juicy Couture, previously a "little-known LA-based brand", "firmly on the map". Complex magazine wrote that the video "completely dominated TRL and pretty much all of MTV with a visual that perfectly encapsulated the '00s aesthetic of a Juicy sweatsuit and big sunglasses."

The music video opens with Lopez leaning on a gate of an urban home in Los Angeles and singing in front of a red backdrop along with Ja Rule, who is also seen walking the streets of LA, with a basketball. Men and women are then seen in various locations such as a park and swimming pool. Lopez and Ja Rule are then seen together in a basketball court in the chorus of the song. These locations are shown for a prominent part of the video, until both of them are later at a party; and sitting together at a park watching children play.

The music video won the award for Best Hip-Hop Video at the 2002 MTV Video Music Awards.

== Live performances ==
Lopez and Ja Rule performed "I'm Real (Murder Remix)" at the 2001 MTV Video Music Awards. Lopez performed the Murder remix as part of her medley during the 2018 MTV Video Music Awards on August 20, 2018, at Radio City Music Hall in New York City.

== Controversies ==
Irv Gotti, who produced the Murder remix of "I'm Real", openly admitted during an interview with XXL magazine that Mottola contacted him with instructions to create a song that sounded exactly like a song he had made with Mariah Carey for the Glitter soundtrack entitled "If We", also featuring Ja Rule.

Furthermore, some in the African American community were outraged by Lopez's use of the racial slur "nigga" in the Murder remix. She said "I tell them niggas, mind they biz, but they don't hear me, though." A free New York concert drew banner-carrying protesters, angry at the lyrics for "I'm Real". In response to this, Lopez said in between performances "For anyone to think or suggest that I'm racist is really absurd and hateful to me. The use of the word in the song—it was actually written by Ja Rule—it was not meant to be hurtful to anybody." Ja Rule also responded to this, defending Lopez by stating "I think it's silly [...] I think the whole thing, like everything else, is being blown out of proportion." Rule said that Lopez was not the first Latino to use the word in a song, and that it had not been an issue previously, adding it was something to let people get a chance to "poke her". Julian Kimble of the website Genius noted in 2016, "Other Latino performers had said the word and ducked the backlash, primarily because their reach didn't compare to Lopez's. To that effect (and apparently unbeknownst to her at the time), the Bronx native's position as world-renowned pop star limited what she could do and say." Kimble observed that her 2002 single "Jenny from the Block" "has always rung like a response to everyone who derided her for the 'I'm Real' remix."

== Credits and personnel ==
Credits adapted from the liner notes of J to tha L–O! The Remixes.

- JD Andrew – engineering assistance
- Seven Aurelius – production
- Jeffrey Atkins – composition, guest vocals
- Milwaukee Buck – engineering
- Tom Coyne – mastering
- Leshan David Lewis – composition
- Eddie Delena – Pro Tools
- Ashanti Douglas – background vocals
- Jay Goin – engineering assistance
- Rick James – composition
- Jennifer Lopez – composition, lead vocals
- Irv Gotti – composition, production, mixing
- Troy Oliver – composition
- Marty Osterer – bass
- Brian Spencer – mixing
- Brian Springer – engineering

== Charts ==
=== Weekly charts ===
2001 weekly chart performance for "I'm Real (Murder Remix)"
Chart (2001)	Peak position
Canada (Nielsen SoundScan)	6
Canada CHR (Nielsen BDS)	2
Eurochart Hot 100 (Music & Media)	3
US Billboard Hot 100	1
US Dance Singles Sales (Billboard)	6
US Hot R&B/Hip-Hop Songs (Billboard)	2
US Pop Airplay (Billboard)	1
US Rhythmic Airplay (Billboard)	1

=== Year-end charts ===
2001 year-end chart performance for "I'm Real (Murder Remix)"
Chart (2001)	Position
Brazil (Crowley)	42
Canada (Nielsen SoundScan) Sony Release	103
Canada (Nielsen SoundScan) RCKT release	186
Canada Radio (Nielsen BDS)	54
US Billboard Hot 100	5
US Hot R&B/Hip-Hop Songs (Billboard)	19
US Pop Airplay (Billboard)	15
US Rhythmic Airplay (Billboard)	6

2002 year-end chart performance for "I'm Real (Murder Remix)"
Chart (2002)	Position
Canada (Nielsen SoundScan)	199
Eurochart Hot 100 (Music & Media)	34
US Mainstream Airplay (Billboard)	63
US Rhythmic Airplay (Billboard)	87

=== Decade-end charts ===
2000s decade-end chart performance for "I'm Real (Murder Remix)"
Chart (2000–2009)	Position
US Billboard Hot 100	30

=== All-time charts ===
All-time chart performance for "I'm Real (Murder Remix)"
Chart (1958–2018)	Position
US Billboard Hot 100	176

== Release history ==
Release dates and formats for "I'm Real (Murder Remix)"
Region	Date	Format(s)	Label(s)	Ref.
United States	September 4, 2001	12-inch vinyl	Epic	
Australia	October 22, 2001	Maxi CD (Note: with "I'm Real")	Sony	
New Zealand	October 22, 2001	CD	Sony	
Germany	October 29, 2001	Maxi CD	Sony	
United Kingdom	October 29, 2001	Cassette; maxi CD	Epic	
United Kingdom	November 5, 2001	12-inch vinyl	Epic	
France	December 10, 2001	Maxi CD	Epic	
