= Enough (film) =

2002 film by Michael Apted

- Theatrical release poster
- Directed by: Michael Apted
- Written by: Nicholas Kazan
- Produced by: Rob Cowan; Irwin Winkler
- Starring: Jennifer Lopez; Billy Campbell; Juliette Lewis; Dan Futterman; Noah Wyle
- Cinematography: Rogier Stoffers
- Edited by: Rick Shaine
- Music by: David Arnold
- Production companies: Columbia Pictures; Winkler Films
- Distributed by: Sony Pictures Releasing
- Release date: May 24, 2002
- Running time: 115 minutes
- Country: United States
- Language: English
- Budget: $38 million
- Box office: $51.8 million

Enough is a 2002 American psychological thriller film directed by Michael Apted, based on the New York Times bestselling 1998 novel Black and Blue, by Anna Quindlen. It stars Jennifer Lopez as Slim, an abused wife who learns to fight back. The film was released theatrically in the United States on May 24, 2002. It received negative reviews from critics and grossed $51.8 million worldwide.

== Plot ==
Slim is a waitress in a Los Angeles diner where she meets wealthy family man Mitch Hiller, who wards off a rude man trying to hit on her for a bet. They eventually marry, have a daughter named Gracie, and live happily in an expensive house.

Six years later, Slim discovers Mitch has been repeatedly cheating on her with seemingly no remorse whatsoever. When she threatens to leave, he beats and threatens her. Mitch insists that because he is the breadwinner, he can do whatever he likes, and he will not end his affair unless she wants to fight him. Mitch warns her not to leave, stating that he refuses to live without her.

Slim goes to Mitch's mother about the abuse. She consoles Slim briefly, but implies that she may have provoked Mitch's reaction, and that he has a history of abuse. Her best friend Ginny advises her to leave him and press charges, but the police cannot assist.

After Mitch taunts Slim, revealing he knows who she has been talking to and has been watching by proxy, Slim sees no choice but to take Gracie and leave. She enlists her friends' help and tries to escape with Gracie late at night, but Mitch foils the plan and beats Slim again while threatening her friends at gunpoint. Mitch is forced to let them escape after they wake up Gracie, as he is unwilling to expose his true nature in front of her.

Mitch empties and freezes Slim's bank accounts, leaving her unable to rent a room. Tracking her down at a cheap motel, he tries to break in, but she escapes with Gracie, moving to Seattle to stay with her ex-boyfriend Joe.

The next day, men posing as FBI agents show up and threaten Joe, damaging his apartment. Slim goes to her wealthy, estranged father, Jupiter. Even though she sent several unanswered letters to him as a child, he claims to have been unaware of her existence and believes she is just after money, unable to accept the fact that he had any children.

Slim and Gracie briefly find refuge at a commune. Jupiter later contacts her there, revealing that Mitch's associates have threatened him as well, causing him to be interested in helping her. He sends Slim a large sum of money, allowing her to set up a new life and identity, and tells her to reach out if she needs more.

Joe visits Slim in Michigan, but Mitch tracks her down with help from his corrupt cop friend Robbie; who had posed as the rude man in the staged altercation where Mitch and Slim first met. This reveals they had been conning women into sleeping with them for their personal gain. Slim narrowly escapes a struggle with Mitch, who attacks her in a rage in front of Gracie. She then gets away from Robbie in a car chase.

Consulting a lawyer, Slim is warned there is little she can do, although he tells her the custody hearing is possibly a trick to lure her back to Mitch. She goes into hiding in San Francisco and sends Gracie away to safety while she trains in Krav Maga while enlisting the help of a woman who looks identical to her.

Slim breaks into Mitch's new home, hides his guns, jams the phone, plants fake letters saying she is there to discuss custody of Gracie and awaits his return. When he arrives, they fight and Slim beats Mitch unconscious before she eventually knocks him off a balcony to his death. The police regard her actions as self-defense. Slim and Gracie reunite and go to live with Joe in Seattle.

== Cast ==
- Jennifer Lopez as Slim / Erin Ann Shleeter
- Billy Campbell as Mitch Hiller
- Tessa Allen as Gracie Hiller, Slim and Mitch's daughter
- Juliette Lewis as Ginny, Slim's friend
- Dan Futterman as Joe, Slim's former boyfriend
- Noah Wyle as Robbie, a cop and associate of Mitch
- Fred Ward as Jupiter, Slim's father
- Christopher Maher as Phil, Slim's friend and father figure
- Janet Carroll as Mrs. Hiller, Mitch's mother
- Bill Cobbs as Jim Toller
- Bruce A. Young as Self-Defense Instructor
- Bruce French as Homeowner
- Ruben Madera as Teddy
- Dan Martin as Fake FBI Agent
- Jeff Kober as Fake FBI Agent (John Boy)
- Brent Sexton as Fake FBI Agent
- Michael Byrne as Desk Sergeant

== Production ==
=== Casting and filming ===
Enough, produced by Columbia Pictures, is directed by Michael Apted and written by Nicholas Kazan. On November 9, 2000, New York Daily News reported that Lopez was in talks to star in Enough, "which follows a newly married young woman's descent into domestic violence after her dream man physically abuses her, causing her to go on the run". Sandra Bullock was originally cast to play Slim, a waitress. In November 2000, Variety magazine reported that Bullock had to back out of Enough because of a scheduling conflict with another film.

On May 19, 2001, it was reported that Lopez was cast as Slim, and Once and Again actor Billy Campbell was cast as Mitch, a "wealthy contractor" and Slim's abusive husband. Juliette Lewis, Noah Wyle, Dan Futterman and Fred Ward were also announced to be co-starring in the film. According to Basham, filming began on May 21, 2001, and took place on location in Los Angeles, San Francisco, Port Townsend and Seattle. During a documentary featured on a special edition DVD of the film, Kazan said Lopez was "very good" at creating the character on the film "through unscripted details, physical gestures and fiddling with props." He described her emotional acting as "perfect pitch". Apted, who had heard rumors that Lopez was a diva, described her as "fantastic" and good to work with. He also noted Lopez was "very much on the case, and that was very impressive."

In 2008, Lopez revealed that during the filming of Enough, she overworked and had a nervous breakdown: "I was suffering from a lack of sleep. And I did have a kind of nervous breakdown. I froze up on set. Well, not on a set, but in my trailer. I was like, I don't want to move, I don't want to talk, I don't want to do anything. It was on that movie, Enough. Yeah, I did. I had a nervous breakdown."

=== Themes ===
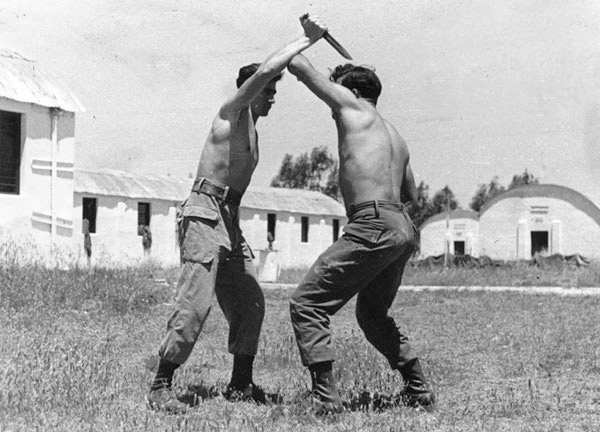
The defense technique of Krav Maga was used by the character Slim to fight back against her abusive husband Mitch

Enough is a thriller film that details an abusive relationship. Its writer Nicholas Kazan commented, "About the worst aspect of the male psyche is that males have been taught, traditionally, to expect to get what they want. Much of the problems that men have, or the problems that men impose on women, have to do with feeling like they're entitled, and that women should do what men want." Ryan J. Downey of MTV News wrote, "Is America ready to see its favorite iced-up, well-manicured diva, Jennifer Lopez, all glammed-down and kicking ass as a battered wife?"

Explaining the concept of the film, Lopez stated: "There's twists and turns and it's exciting ... but it also has a message, which is what attracted me to it in the first place, which is an empowering thing." Describing its message, she said "[If] you're in these negative situations, negative relationships, whatever, you can get out ... The power to get out of those things is always within yourself. That's the message of the movie." When Lopez read the script, she knew she was "going to have to do [the] whole sequence at the end" which featured an act that required her to "become a believable lean, mean fighting machine."

Lopez then thought she should learn tai chi or taekwondo, but was worried about learning it at an expert level in a short time. Her trainer then suggested that she study Krav Maga, which, according to MTV News, is the "official self-defense system of the Israeli Defense Forces which has recently become trendy in the States. The fighting style focuses on combating realistic scenarios with moves that are based on common, instinctual reactions." Talking about the system, Lopez said: "[Krav Maga] levels out the playing field between men and women ... Where it doesn't matter how big or tall or strong you are. You can actually maneuver around that. It's about getting out of the way, counter-attacking and using whatever you can to get the upper hand."

During an interview with Lopez, discussing the resolution of the film, journalist Diane Sawyer of ABC News noted that people "in the abuse counseling industry have said: you can't tell women that; they can't do that. That's something that's dangerous, even to see it in their minds." Lopez responded: "...this is a movie that touches upon those themes, but really, it's a thriller ... it's about empowering yourself in any situation ... that you have. When I read the script, I saw it as: you have the power within yourself, no matter how severe the situation can be, to change whatever that is, to find that power within yourself to change any negative situation."

== Release ==
=== Box office ===
Enough was planned to be released in September 2001, but was pushed back to "early" 2002. It was released on May 24, 2002. With a production budget of $38 million, its first run grossed $40 million domestically and a total of $51.8 million worldwide. After its opening week, Enough ranked at No. 5 on the American Box Office chart, grossing over $14 million screened across 2,623 theaters. The next week, it grossed $6.8 million, dropping to No. 7 at the box office, and grossed $3.7 million after its third week, falling to No. 9.

=== Home media ===
Columbia TriStar Home Entertainment released Enough on DVD on October 8, 2002. This release came with the film in widescreen 2.40:1 and fullscreen 1.33:1, as well as the film's theatrical trailer and the music video for "Alive", performed by Lopez for the film's soundtrack. A VHS edition was released on March 4, 2003. A special edition DVD was released on September 16, 2003. It comes with a range of extras which includes three deleted scenes: "Strip Joint Break In", "Enough Is Enough" and "Krav Maga: Contact Combat", as well as featurettes that detail the making of the film. The previous DVD's extras were also included.

During a "making-of" documentary for the film entitled "Max on the Set: Enough" Lopez stated she was attracted to Enough because it was "like a female Rocky". Cynthia Fuchs from PopMatters wrote an in-depth review of the special edition DVD release and said: "Just why this film needs a second DVD release is unclear, except for the apparent diktat that there is no such thing as enough or even too much J-Lo".

== Reception ==
=== Critical response ===
On Rotten Tomatoes, the film holds an approval rating of 22% based on 125 reviews, with an average rating of 4.1/10. The site's critics consensus reads: "Enough exploits the serious issue of spousal abuse to make an illogical, unintelligent thriller." On Metacritic, the film has a weighted average score of 25 out of 100, based on 32 critics, indicating "generally unfavorable" reviews. Audiences surveyed by CinemaScore gave the film an average grade of "A−" on an A+ to F scale.

Stephen Holden of The New York Times said Lopez "holds the screen in a star performance that has less to do with acting than with embodying a forceful, streetwise woman who stands up for herself", while commenting that its preview had "audience gasping" and "Enough does a better job than most movies of sustaining a mood of palpable physical menace, then confirming your worst fears". Alice King of Entertainment Weekly described the film's plot as "arduously nonsensical" and felt that Lopez lacked connection with her on-screen daughter Tessa Allen, commenting that: "All this to protect a helium-voiced little girl with whom Lopez has so little chemistry, it's as if she's handling garbage rather than a small child."

Blake French from Contactmusic.com was underwhelmed with the development of the film, and was critical that the film does not use Slim's old friend and romantic interest enough, nor does it develop Slim's real and adopted father figures while it "uses the tiresome old 'kid' cliché. Gracie is, as always, just old enough to understand the situation, but not quite old enough to make an actual impact in the story." French did praise Lopez in the end sequence, "By the final scenes, despite their obviousness, I was as engrossed in the movie as I could have been, actually rooting for J. Lo to kick some bad guy butt".

Mick LaSalle of the San Francisco Chronicle wrote: "Lopez has an image of being sexy and tough, but her appeal as an actress is that she's down to earth and that her emotions are accessible. There's nothing cold about her." Additionally, LaSalle felt that "It's the most tension-producing movie out there right now", stating that "it has the biggest visceral kick, capable of inspiring blood lust in otherwise peaceful viewers.

ReelViews' James Berardinelli said Enough is director "[Michael] Apted at his most commercial, and, unfortunately, his least compelling." Michael Atkinson of The Village Voice called Campbell the film's "primary power source", "His steely gaze and overbearing quietude are forever tainted; Once and Again doesn't stand a chance in Lifetime reruns".

Robert Koehler of Variety was negative: "Enough, a thriller detailing how a good wife gets back at an evil, possessive husband, is never provocative enough to generate strong emotional response." Roger Ebert of the Chicago Sun-Times wrote how Enough was fundamentally similar to the 1978 exploitation flick I Spit on Your Grave "in which a man victimizes a woman for the first half of the film, and then the woman turns the tables in an extended sequence of graphic violence." Ebert also added: "It's surprising to see a director like Michael Apted and an actress like Jennifer Lopez associated with such tacky material."

Paula Nechack of the Seattle Post-Intelligencer called Enough "implausible and ugly" and felt that it had already been done by actresses including Julia Roberts and Ashley Judd, and its script was "more than enough of a mess to tarnish her box-office luster."

Maitland McDonagh of TV Guide reviewed the film negatively, but praised the ending sequence, "If ever a movie was undermined by its packaging, it's this formulaic thriller about a resourceful battered wife and the brutal husband who won't let her go ... the entire promotional campaign is driven by the last 20 minutes, in which Slim becomes a lean, mean fighting machine and kicks the bastard's ass".

Nathan Rabin of The A.V. Club said "the film's idiocy works for Lopez: Every diva needs at least one camp classic on her résumé". Desson Thomson from The Washington Post emphasized his disappointment with the film, stating: "In terms of actual social conscience, the movie gets a demagogic, rabble-rousing F. It also gets a failed grade for honest writing."

In retrospect the film has been viewed more positively. It has been called "an underrated thriller" and ranked among Lopez's best films.

=== Accolades ===
Jennifer Lopez was nominated for a Golden Raspberry Award for Worst Actress for her performance in the film (as well as for Maid in Manhattan) but lost in a tie to both Madonna for Swept Away and Britney Spears for Crossroads.

== Soundtrack ==
Enough

Film score by David Arnold
- Released: June 4, 2002
- Recorded: 2002
- Genre: Film soundtrack
- Label: Varèse Sarabande

David Arnold chronology
| Hollywood Ending (2002) | Enough (2002) | Die Another Day (2002) |

The official score for Enough was composed by David Arnold, conducted by Nicholas Dodd, performed by the Hollywood Studio Symphony and released by Audio CD on June 4, 2002. In addition to its score, Lopez recorded the song entitled "Alive", which she co-wrote with her then-husband Cris Judd. Although it served as the song's soundtrack and was used during the film, it does not appear on the film's score.

| No. | Title | Length |
|---|---|---|
| 1. | "Give Me a Sign" | 5:23 |
| 2. | "F.B.I.?" | 4:40 |
| 3. | "New Leaf" | 1:44 |
| 4. | "Will The Real Slim Hiller Please Stand Up?" | 2:03 |
| 5. | "Get Out of the House" | 7:15 |
| 6. | "Goodbye Gracie" | 1:43 |
| 7. | "Training Day" | 3:11 |
| 8. | "Breaking In" | 2:23 |
| 9. | "Setting the Trap" | 5:42 |
| 10. | "Fight club" | 8:50 |
| 11. | "One of the Lucky Ones" | 1:37 |
| Total length: | | 44:31 |
