= Enrique Iglesias & Jennifer Lopez Tour =

2012 co-headlining concert tour

- Continental tour by Enrique Iglesias and Jennifer Lopez
- Promotional poster for the tour
- Location: North America
- Start date: July 14, 2012
- End date: September 1, 2012
- Legs: 1
- No. of shows: 24 in North America
- Attendance: 265,647
- Box office: $21.2 million
Enrique Iglesias tour chronology
Euphoria Tour (2011–12)	Enrique Iglesias & Jennifer Lopez Tour (2012)	Sex and Love Tour (2014–15)
Jennifer Lopez tour chronology
Dance Again World Tour (2012)	Enrique Iglesias & Jennifer Lopez Tour (2012)	Jennifer Lopez: All I Have (2016–18)

The Enrique Iglesias & Jennifer Lopez Tour was a co-headlining concert tour by Spanish singer Enrique Iglesias and American entertainer Jennifer Lopez. It began on July 14, 2012 in Montreal and concluded on September 1, 2012 in Miami. The trek was presented by State Farm and was promoted by AEG Live and followed the end of Iglesias's Euphoria Tour and the beginning of Lopez's Dance Again World Tour. Puerto Rican duo Wisin & Yandel was to be the opening act of the tour, but they dropped out weeks before the tour was set to begin, due to "unresolvable issues".

== Background ==
In March 2012, it was announced that Lopez would headline two popular music festivals in Brazil. While promoting the announcement, the singer mentioned she would like to venture onto a world tour "at some point". Following the announcement, music publication Billboard reported Lopez was in talks to conduct a co-headlining tour with Enrique Iglesias. The rumors became official as Lopez announced the joint tour on "On Air with Ryan Seacrest", April 30, 2012. Later that day, Lopez and Iglesias held a press conference at Boulevard3. The conference was streamed live on Lopez's official website. During the conference, Iglesias stated the pairing felt "right" and he was excited to go on his first joint tour. In 2011, the Spanish singer was slated to join American singer Britney Spears on her Femme Fatale Tour; however he backed out just hours after the announcement.

The tour is marketed as Lopez's "first world tour". In 2007, the singer toured with estranged husband Marc Anthony for her first joint tour. Further details reveal famed tour director Jamie King will direct the show alongside Lopez's current boyfriend Casper Smart. Zuhair Murad is slated to design tour costumes for Lopez. Iglesias and Lopez plan on performing a new duet, exclusive to the tour.

== Development ==
Commenting on the tour, Lopez stated:

I was going to go on tour, he was going to go on tour and it was like, 'Well, why don’t we go on tour together?' We sat down and we talked about it and people went crazy for the idea. […] We are going to give you everything we got. I think it's going to be one of the most historic tours ever. […] There's never been something like this, where Latinos come together like this. It's international – English and Spanish. I just think it's very groundbreaking. I was honored to be asked to be a part of it".

== Concert synopsis ==
Lopez's set opened with a "JLO" style curtain; with male dancers dressed in grey tuxedos, top hats, and canes dancing in front of it. The curtain drops, revealing an "old" Hollywood-themed dance and video sequence, set to her song "Never Gonna Give Up". She would then emerge from behind the parted screens, greeting the crowd by stating: "Hello lovers." She opened with "Get Right", which was accompanied by purple-lighting and "pyramid dance formations." She then broke out into a "funked-up" version of "Love Don't Cost a Thing" and "I'm Into You" followed by "Waiting for Tonight" which was performed on a mini moving stage upon the stage. Prior to a performance of "Goin' In" in a boxing ring, there was an extended boxing scene video set to "Louboutins". She stated: "When you fall down, you get back up", making reference to her fall at the American Music Awards in 2009 after her performance of "Louboutins." A "hip-hop heavy" "back-to-my-roots" medley then occurred. Lopez said: "I'm a simple girl from New York City — the Bronx" before performing "Jenny from the Block", "I'm Real", "All I Have" and "Ain't It Funny (Murder Remix)".

After a short break which featured a video clip of Lopez and Beau Smart, her boyfriend at the time, playing peak-a-boo set to her song "Baby I Love You!", Lopez returned to the stage after a costume change. It was followed by an old-school performance of "Hold It, Don't Drop It", which featured Lopez's intentional comedic refusal to leave the stage. She then said "Shall we slow it down a little bit?" before singing an acoustic version of her very first song, "If You Had My Love". "Until It Beats No More" followed, with the backdrops showing a slide show of pictures and videos of her with her children. In the fourth section of her set, Lopez did a "cabaret routine" performance of "Let's Get Loud", before stripping off her suit for a performance of "Papi". She then sat on a raised throne to perform "Lambada" and "On the Floor". Lopez's encore was a performance of "Dance Again"; the opening of the song featured a video clip in which a masked Lopez declared "You will live, you will love...and you will Dance Again".

After a 50-minute intermission, Iglesias's set began with the words "It's My Time! Are you ready?" appearing on a screen. He then emerged in jeans and a t-shirt, opening with "Tonight (I'm Lovin' You)"; he sung the song through auto-tuned vocals. He then stated "Can i get a little crazy?" before switching the lyrics to the explicit version of the song Tonight (I'm Fuckin' You); this is followed by "I Like How It Feels", before performing "Dirty Dancer" with visual assistance via technology from Usher. Iglesias would then pick a man from the audience to come on stage with him to sing "Stand By Me" followed by him singing "Hero" to a random female fan in the audience.

== Critical response ==
A writer from the Montreal Gazette gave the opening night of the tour a positive review, saying that Lopez won by "showering everyone with riches" while Iglesias scored a "partial partial victory by paying attention to the faces in the crowd". However, the writer did criticize the fact that Lopez's set went first, and said that "Both artists would have benefited if their 70- to 80-minute sets had been flipped: Iglesias wouldn’t have been eclipsed by Lopez pulling out all the stops, and Lopez would have had the glory of the big show-ending moment rather than the glory of the big pre-bathroom-break moment."

== Set list ==
These set lists are from the concert on July 17, 2012 in Toronto. It is not intended to represent all shows from the tour.

Jennifer Lopez
1. "Never Gonna Give Up" (Intro)
2. "Get Right"
3. "Love Don't Cost a Thing"
4. "I'm Into You"
5. "Waiting for Tonight"
6. "Goin' In" (Intermission) (contains elements of "Louboutins")
7. "I'm Real"
8. "All I Have"
9. "Feelin' So Good"
10. "Ain't It Funny (Murder Remix)"
11. "Jenny from the Block"
12. "Baby I Love U!" (Intermission)
13. "Hold It Don't Drop It"
14. "Starting Over" (Intermission) (contains elements of "I'm Glad" and "Secretly")
15. "If You Had My Love"
16. "Until It Beats No More"
17. "Let's Get Loud"
18. "Papi"
19. "Lambada" / On the Floor"

Encore

20. "Dance Again"
Enrique Iglesias
1. "Tonight (I'm Lovin' You)"
2. "I Like How It Feels"
3. "Dirty Dancer"
4. "Rhythm Divine"
5. "Bailamos"
6. "Ring My Bells"
7. "Don't You Forget"
8. "Stand by Me"
9. "Be with You"
10. "Escape"

Encore

11. "Hero"
12. "I Like It"
13. "Tonight (I'm Lovin' You)" (Reprise)

== Shows ==
List of concerts, showing date, city, country, venue, opening act, tickets sold, number of available tickets and amount of gross revenue
Date	City	Country	Venue	Opening act	Attendance	Revenue
July 14, 2012	Montreal	Canada	Bell Centre	DJ Toddy Flores	26,912 / 26,912	$2,324,561
July 15, 2012	Montreal	Canada	Bell Centre	DJ Toddy Flores	26,912 / 26,912	$2,324,561
July 17, 2012	Toronto	Canada	Air Canada Centre	DJ Toddy Flores	27,413 / 27,413	$2,412,155
July 18, 2012	Toronto	Canada	Air Canada Centre	DJ Toddy Flores	27,413 / 27,413	$2,412,155
July 20, 2012	Newark	United States	Prudential Center	Frankie J	21,147 / 21,147	$1,325,295
July 21, 2012	Newark	United States	Prudential Center	Frankie J	21,147 / 21,147	$1,325,295
July 25, 2012	Boston	United States	TD Garden	Frankie J	10,416 / 10,416	$794,276
July 26, 2012	Uncasville	United States	Mohegan Sun Arena	—N/a	7,169 / 7,169	$444,732
July 28, 2012	Washington, D.C.	United States	Verizon Center	Frankie J	11,555 / 11,555	$983,007
July 29, 2012	Atlantic City	United States	Boardwalk Hall	Frankie J	11,220 / 11,220	$760,973
August 1, 2012	Minneapolis	United States	Target Center	Frankie J	6,458 / 6,458	$478,405
August 3, 2012	Chicago	United States	United Center	Frankie J	12,403 / 12,403	$1,079,842
August 4, 2012	Kansas City	United States	Sprint Center	Frankie J	7,177 / 7,177	$360,355
August 8, 2012	San Jose	United States	HP Pavilion	Frankie J Starshell	11,590 / 11,590	$927,022
August 11, 2012	Anaheim	United States	Honda Center	Frankie J Starshell	11,021 / 11,021	$904,553
August 16, 2012	Los Angeles	United States	Staples Center	Frankie J	26,356 / 26,356	$2,016,192
August 17, 2012	Los Angeles	United States	Staples Center	Frankie J	26,356 / 26,356	$2,016,192
August 18, 2012	Las Vegas	United States	Mandalay Bay Events Center	Frankie J	8,066 / 8,066	$1,223,438
August 23, 2012	San Antonio	United States	AT&T Center	Frankie J	12,149 / 12,149	$881,913
August 25, 2012	Dallas	United States	American Airlines Center	Frankie J	10,977 / 10,977	$912,710
August 26, 2012	Houston	United States	Toyota Center	Frankie J	10,510 / 10,510	$865,460
August 29, 2012	Atlanta	United States	Philips Arena	Frankie J Starshell	9,202 / 10,225	$516,543
August 31, 2012	Miami	United States	American Airlines Arena	Frankie J Starshell	23,906 / 23,906	$1,985,396
September 1, 2012	Miami	United States	American Airlines Arena	Frankie J Starshell	23,906 / 23,906	$1,985,396
Total					265,647 / 266,670	$21,196,828

== Cancelled shows ==
List of cancelled concerts, showing date, city, country, venue and reason
Date	City	Country	Venue	Reason
August 12, 2012	Anaheim	United States	Honda Center	Unknown
September 2, 2012	Orlando	United States	Amway Center	Logistical issues
