= Dance Again World Tour =

2012 concert tour by Jennifer Lopez

- World tour by Jennifer Lopez
- Location: South America; Oceania; Asia; Europe; North America
- Associated album: Dance Again... the Hits
- Start date: June 14, 2012
- End date: December 22, 2012
- Legs: 5
- No. of shows: 54
- Box office: US$100.2 million (Note: US$84.42 million in 2025 dollars.)

Jennifer Lopez concert chronology
- Jennifer Lopez & Marc Anthony en Concierto (2007); Dance Again World Tour (2012); Enrique Iglesias & Jennifer Lopez Tour (2012)

Dance Again World Tour was the first solo worldwide concert tour by American entertainer Jennifer Lopez. Throughout the majority of her music career, beginning in 1999, a world tour by Lopez was anticipated, though it never materialized. Following the release of her seventh studio album Love? (2011), she was more intent on touring than ever. However, it was not until March 2012 when the tour came into the works. As rumors began to circulate, Lopez later confirmed that April that she would be embarking on her first world tour. It commenced on June 14, 2012, in Panama City, Panama, and concluded on December 22, 2012, in San Juan, Puerto Rico.

Fashion designer Zuhair Murad, a frequent collaborator of Lopez, designed all of the tour's costumes. Lopez, who creatively directed the show, included several different personal themes into the tour, which was split into four parts. These themes included old Hollywood glamour, funk, love and partying, as well as Lopez's "Jenny from the Block" persona and her hip-hop upbringing in The Bronx, New York. Generally, Lopez aimed to convey a message about dancing again and feeling innovated.

The tour was a commercial success with a gross revenue of $60.2 million, making it the sixth highest-grossing concert tour by a Latina artist and the highest-grossing tour by a Latin artist of 2012. Critics praised Lopez's choreography and stage act and described the show as an "explosion" of color and sound, while also remaining faithful to Lopez's humble "Jenny from the Block" persona. During the tour, Lopez embarked on a separate co-headlining tour with Spanish singer Enrique Iglesias from July 14 to September 1, 2012.

== Background ==
Following her two Let's Get Loud concerts in 2001, Lopez announced she would like to go on a full tour in 2002, however, this plan did not come to fruition. In January 2005, Lopez revealed to MTV News that she was in the midst of planning a tour to support her fourth studio album, Rebirth. Lopez stated: "I've tried to plan a tour so many times [...] And we're planning it again. It's exciting. We'll see if it happens [...] I've learned not to get my hopes up. I can't wait!" Lopez also added that she envisioned the tour as "Just me doing my thing". However, details for a tour were never unveiled and there subsequently was never one. In May 2011, Lopez announced plans to launch a tour in support of her seventh studio album Love?. Lopez stated that: "My fans have waited a long time for this. We really want to do it at least once in my lifetime."

In March 2012, it was announced that Lopez would headline two popular music festivals in Brazil. While promoting the announcement, the singer mentioned she would like to venture onto a world tour "at some point".

== Development ==
"We have a lot of choreographers working with us. It's going to be an amazing, amazing show."

— Lopez

In April 2012, a source told Celebuzz, "J.Lo and her team have blocked out more than a month of their schedules, beginning May 4, to start intense rehearsals, each day, at a sound stage in the Los Angeles area. This will be a huge tour, complete with a lavish set, full band and team of dancers." The Dance Again World Tour was directed by famed tour director Jamie King, alongside Casper Smart, who also served as its choreographer. Lopez served as creative director of the set, which consisted of an eighteen-body band including dancers. Her manager Benny Medina was executive producer, while managing the show alongside Steve Brumbach.

Lopez incorporated several personal themes into the tour, which reflected upon different aspects of her career. During an interview with the Australian television series Today, she explained that she "wanted to put on something" that her fans would "really be satisfied with". "There's a lot of different sides of me" she stated, "[There's] kinda like the Jenny from the Block side and this glamour Hollywood persona, red carpet thing." Lopez wanted to "make sure" she "got it all" in there for her fans. As an artist, Lopez felt that it was her job to "bare" her soul, and wanted her concert viewers to walk away with her message of dancing again. She told the website HollywoodLife, "I had control to deliver this message, so I did. I wanted to have the audience leave a little more hopeful. They jumped, danced, felt silly and may now would be thinking, 'Ok things didn't work out before, but maybe this time, it will.'"

== Wardrobe ==
Four of Murad's designs for the tour

Lebanese fashion designer Zuhair Murad designed Lopez's costumes and fabrication for the Dance Again World Tour. Lopez revealed to People in May 2012, "Zuhair Murad is going to do all my costumes. We're still thinking about [the looks]." Murad has designed pieces, which are described as "capricious designs", for Lopez frequently over the years. In 2010, a dress he designed for Lopez evoked "crying", while creating a "spider web-inspired bodysuit" for her performance at KIIS-FM's Wango Tango concert the following year. Additionally, Murad was responsible for Lopez's dress at the Academy Awards in 2012 having "ingeniously stole the show from nearly every other red carpet guest". Rolling Stone's Colleen Nika spoke positively about Murad designing the wardrobe, "Whatever looks the two end up conjuring together, they're guaranteed, on Lopez's shapely form, to strike a sexy, maximalist note". Lopez was a big fan of Murad's creations, often sporting them on American Idol.

Lopez's wardrobe for the tour includes "a feathered skirt and hat, a jumpsuit, a cape, a bodysuit and several short dresses". On June 12, 2012, Murad unveiled the tour's first costume sketches. The dress she was wearing "features thousands of red beads hand-sewn onto nude silk tulle in a flame pattern". Murad was also reported, at the time, to have been working on a bodysuit and several short frocks. Overall, Murad created six new looks for Lopez's show.

Lopez was forced to conceal her provocative performance and wardrobe by conservative Muslim laws. This occurred at her Indonesian concert. Chairi Ibrahim, project manager for the venue, told CNN that "She'll have to cover up a little bit" as well as altering her "sexual dance moves" and stage performance. Lopez's back-up dancers also had to alter their appearance. Instead, during her Jakarta concert she wore "a baggy silver jumpsuit, which concealed her famous curvaceous figure, as opposed to the tour's signature nude sparkling cat jumpsuit, which she regularly wore on tour" according to The Jakarta Post. Her back-up dancers had to cover their "bare chests" and "revealing cleavage".

== Concert synopsis ==
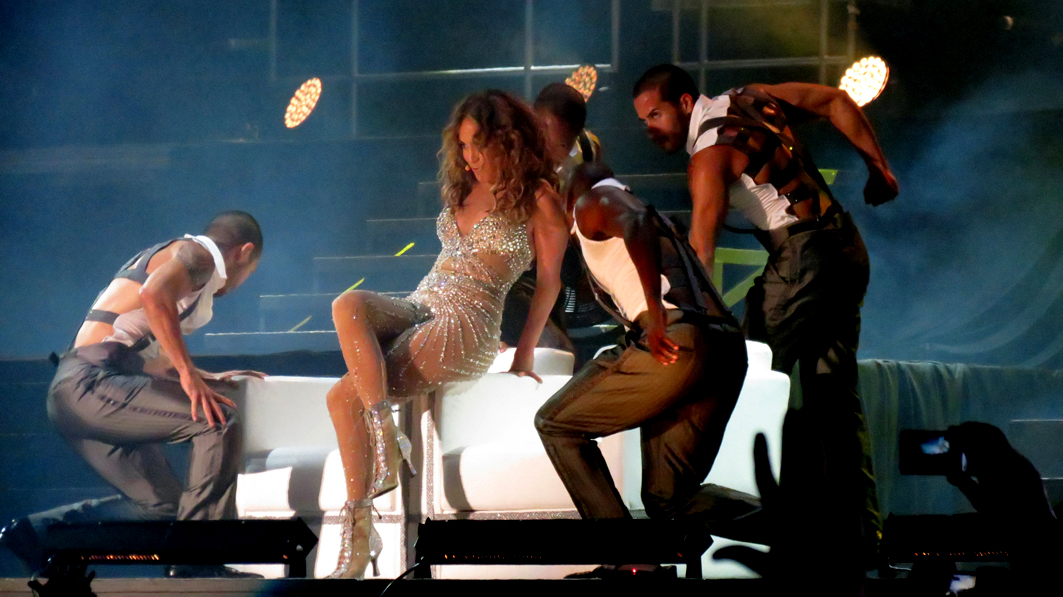
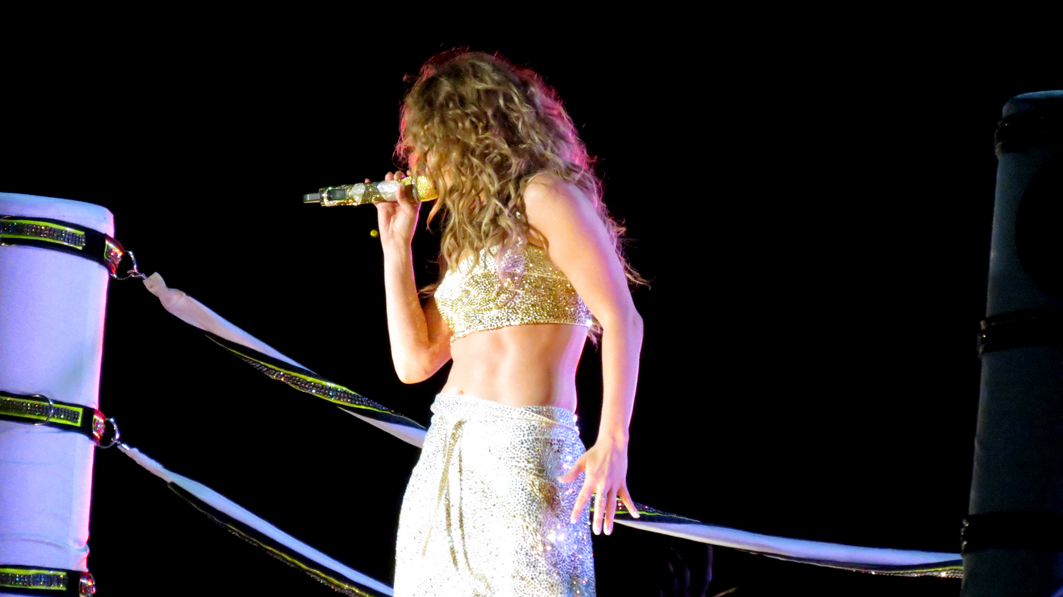
A lavish white couch is brought on stage during "Love Don't Cost a Thing" (left) while "Goin' In" is performed in a boxing ring (right)

The Dance Again World Tour is split into four acts. The first is based around an old Hollywood glamour theme. A large curtain printed with the "J.Lo" logo printed appears. The 90-minute show begins with a broadway themed video clip of Lopez, set to the song "Never Gonna Give Up". A group of male dancers with top hats perform an opening sequence, before the curtain drops. Lopez makes her glamorous entrance, while wearing the feathered skirt. She rips the skirt off, revealing a sparkly catsuit. She greets the crowds, "Hello Lovers, Let's get it!", before she opens with "Get Right". Her performance of a "rocked-out" version of "Get Right" contained "infectious horn riffs". She then quickly switches to "Love Don't Cost a Thing", before stopping to greet the audience again. She resumes with performances of "I'm Into You", featuring Lil Wayne on the big screen, and "Waiting for Tonight". "Love Don't Cost a Thing" features a fold-out chair, while "Waiting for Tonight" is performed on a white moving platform set up on the stage.

Following an intercession, the concert's second act, dedicated to Lopez's upbringing in The Bronx, New York and her hip-hop roots, begins. It includes a medley, choreographed by Parris Goebel. Featured artists of all songs appear on the big screen. The act begins with a boxing video set to the song "Louboutins". The message is to "get back when you fall down". A boxing ring then appears on stage and Lopez emerges with a different costume, a gold cape, and sings "Goin' In". Her dancers are seen wearing gold and black boxing gloves with glitter on them. After her performance of "Goin' In" finished, Lopez states, "Do you see the fight earlier? When we fall down, we have to get up. It's also how we do it where I come from." Additionally, Lopez talks about the fight: how the "little guy" fell down and got back up despite high competition.

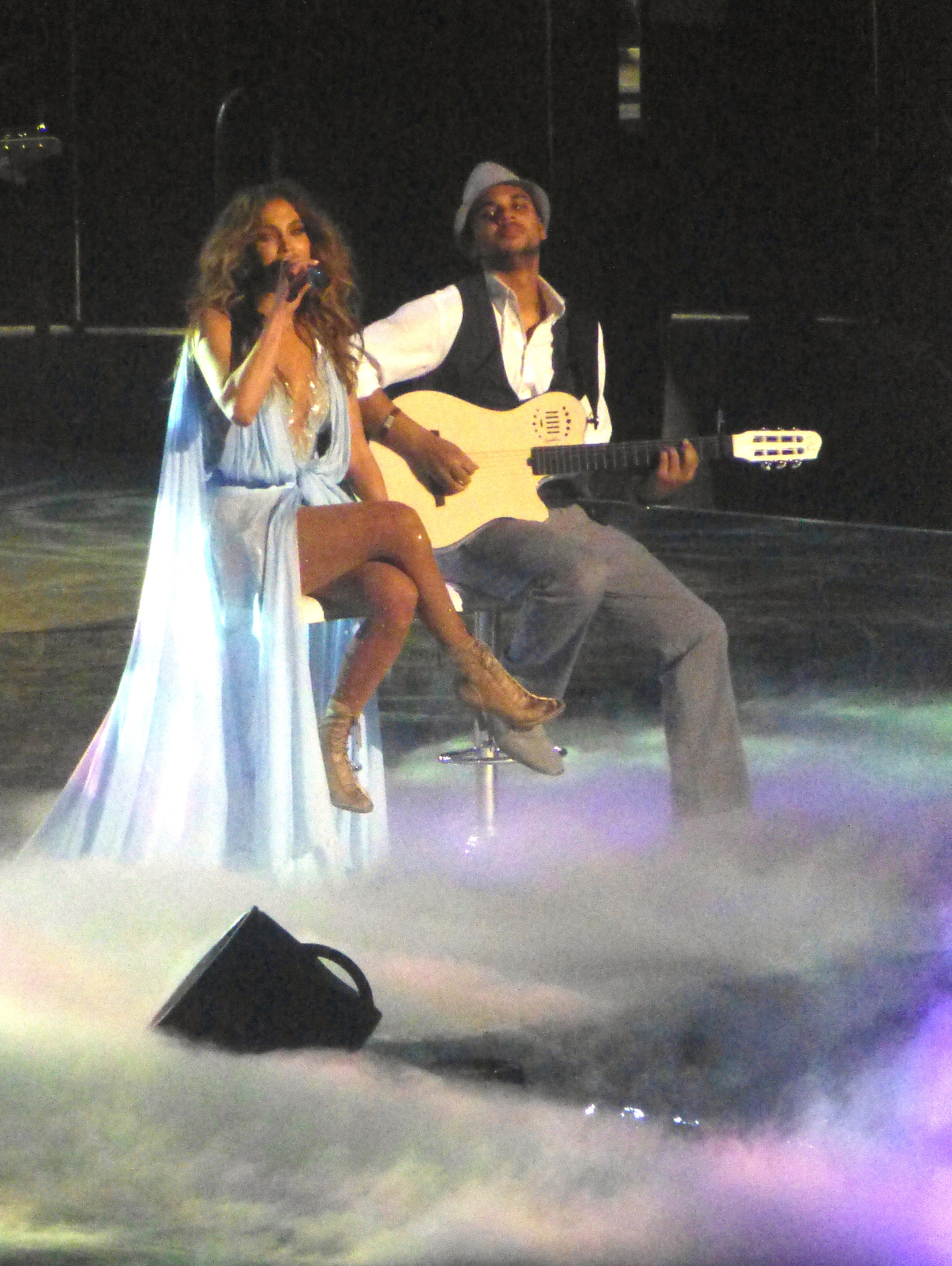
Lopez during a stripped-down performance of "If You Had My Love"

Following this, the "Back-to-Bronx" medley begins. She is seen wearing a tilted silver cap. She breaks into "I'm Real", "All I Have" and the murder remix version of "Ain't It Funny". She finishes off this act with "Jenny from the Block". Before performing the song, Lopez states, "I'm just a simple girl from the Bronx. Don't believe all this glitter. I'm just a girl from New York, a long way from home." In another concert she states, "I'm just a simple girl from the Bronx with a humble beginning." Robert Copsey of Digital Spy stated that the mood of this was: "fitting for an artist of whom many of her hits punctuated the crowd's teenagehoods", while Rachael Wheeler of Daily Mirror said: "Watching the concert was like going back through my teenage years, past drunken house parties at uni and all the way up to a night out last week."

The concert's third act is based around a theme of "Funk & Love" with an old-school uptown theater theme. During the intermission between the second and third part, a video clip of Lopez and her boyfriend to the song "Baby I Love U!" plays. She then states: "Enough of this lovey dovey shit, gimme some funk!" and sings "Hold It, Don't Drop It". A medley of "I'm Glad", "Brave", "Secretly" then occurs. After a minor break, Lopez returns to the stage and slows it down for a performance of the acoustic version of "If You Had My Love", and then a heart-warming performance of "Until It Beats No More" while a slideshow video clip featuring pictures and video clips of her and her four-year-old twins is played in the background. During both songs, she wore a flowing turquoise dress and basked in "purple light and smoke".

The fourth act is based around a partying theme. After retreating backstage following "Until It Beats No More", Lopez returns on-stage wearing a tuxedo with pink ruffles while playing a bongo. She then opens this section with "Let's Get Loud" right after playing the bongo drums. As the performance progressed, her dancers ripped off the tuxedo to reveal a black-laced body suit. She then breaks into "Papi" and then "On the Floor". The show's encore is a performance of "Dance Again". The opening of the performance featured a video clip in which a masked Lopez declared "You will live, you will love...and you will Dance Again". She is joined by her boyfriend Casper Smart on stage, who also appears in the music video for the song, during the song's dancebreak.

== Commercial performance ==
Several of Lopez's shows have garnered her spots on Billboard's Box-score lists. Her Valencia, Venezuela concert made the list's top-ten, ranking at nine having grossed a total of $1,748,020 with 4,900 tickets sold. Her concert in Zürich, Switzerland was ranked twenty-five on the list having grossed $1,142,530 with 10,400 tickets sold. The tour's American leg generated $21.2 million at the box office. With ticket sales reported from the first fifteen concert arenas, the tour's revenue reached over $12.7 million, from 164,481 sold seats. For the week of August 31, 2012, Iglesias and Lopez were ranked No. 2 on Billboard's list of "Top 10 Grossing Tours". All of the leg's concerts, excluding one show in Atlanta, were sold out.

Lopez's concert in Manila, Philippines sold out fully, and according to Manila Times, audiences had to endure "hellish traffic" to get to the venue. In Australia, twenty $800 "meet and greet" tickets were made available per show and successfully sold out swiftly. The tickets were considered over-priced, labeled as "overwhelming" by news.com.au. Her Dubai concert tickets sold out quickly. Sally Edwards, Director of the Dubai Calendar, said Lopez "has shown us why she has been named the number one global celebrity by Forbes Magazine" and called the success overwhelming. Of her Dubai concert, Natalie Long of Tabloid! noted that Lopez sold out at the Dubai Media City Amphitheatre months ahead of time which marked a "rarity".

== Critical response ==
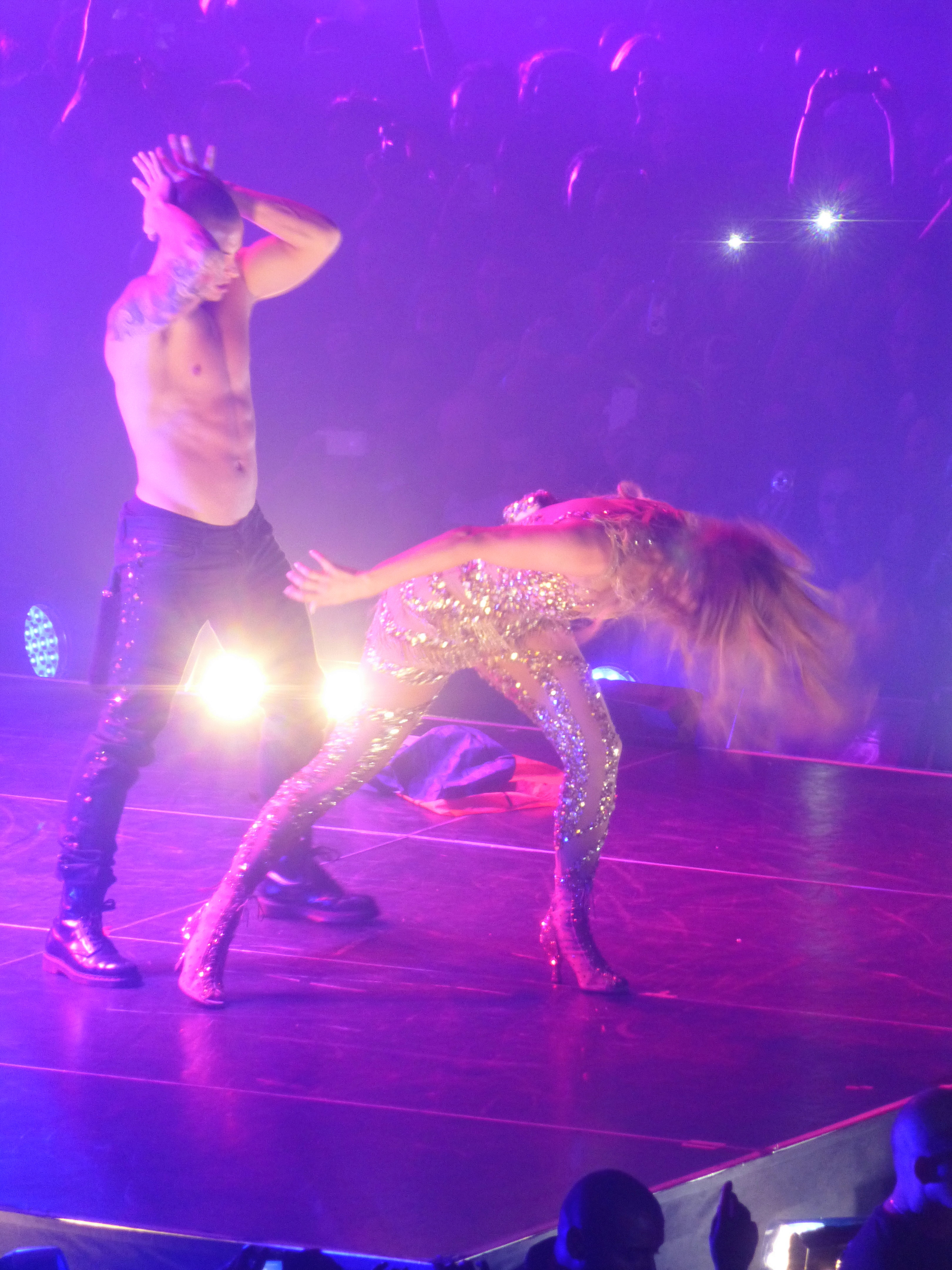
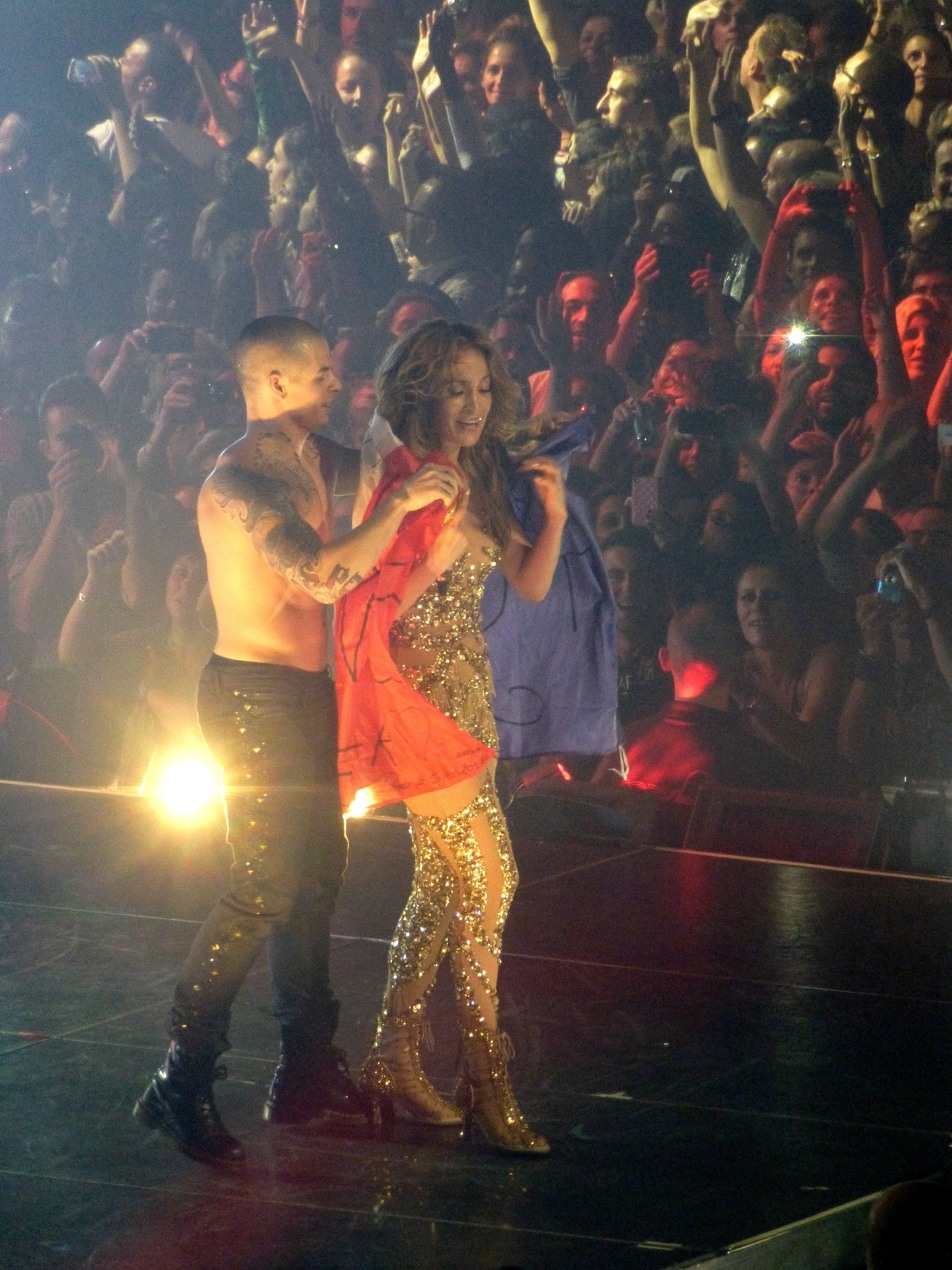
On-stage during the show's encore performance of "Dance Again"

The Dance Again World Tour garnered acclaim throughout its run. Of her concert in Recife, where it rained, The Huffington Post's Ashley Percival said Lopez's "sex-pack was on show for all to see" as she was "still getting her impressive bod out despite the downpour", calling her a "trooper" for dancing in the rain. Cory Lopez of Celebuzz praised Lopez's physicality and said "despite the heavy downpour, a smiling J.Lo kept the show going". Rachael Wheeler of Daily Mirror described the show as an "explosion of sound, dance and colour". Wheeler said that while Lopez was "a very small singer on a very big stage" she "absolutely dominated The O2, with massive routines full of hardcore choreography seeing the former dancer strutting." The Guardian's Caroline Sullivan said of Lopez's stage performance "At the end, it isn't J-Lo the mother or even J-Lo the diva who sticks in the mind, but Jenny from the block, who still knows where she came from". Robert Copsey of the British website Digital Spy said that Lopez looks "mind-bogglingly youthful and trim", and said that her boxing-ring performance of "Goin' In" allowed her "to display her enviable abs and hi-NRG dance moves."

A writer from Today's Zaman said "her stage performance was visually enriched by lasers, costumes, and dance moves", while Turkish Weekly said that she "blew away her fans". According to the website Novinite, her Bulgarian concert audience was "mesmerized" by her. Natalie Long from Tabloid praised her uptempo performance but also praised her vocals on "Until It Beats No More", stating that she "proved she was the perfect American Idol judge" with "great pipes". Pocholo Concepción of the Philippine Daily Inquirer described her performance in Manila, Philippines as "spellbinding" and wrote that her stage act was "powerful enough to soften the hearts of skeptics and critics. Backed by a six-member live band and two backup vocalists, Lopez couldn't do anything wrong – even if at times her solo singing spots revealed the inadequacy of her vocal skills." Amanda Lago of GMA News said that the beginning of the Filipino show was "slightly underwhelming" but the crowd "cheered endlessly and cried out" for Lopez. Lago criticized Lopez's by noting that while "the dancing was flawless from the get-go" the vocals weren't.

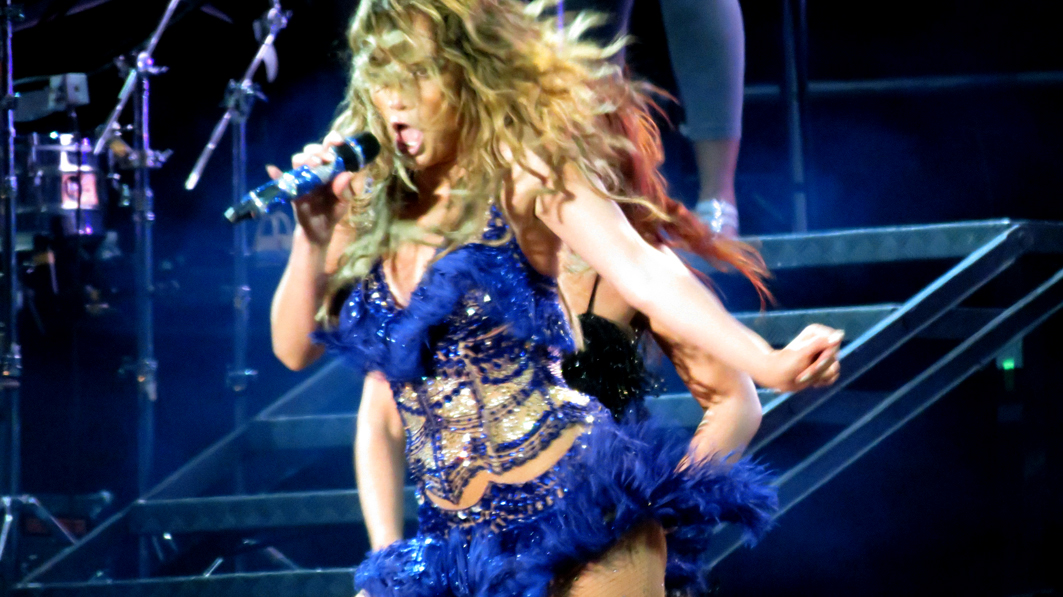
Lopez performs "Hold It Don't Drop It"

Hans Nicholas Jong of The Jakarta Post called her Jakarta concert an "explosion of color and sound filled with intricate, heart-pounding choreography" which proved that "she really is still Jenny from the Block". Jong said that she "hit all the dance moves while singing in-tune at the same time without seemingly breaking a single sweat." Chairi Ibrahim from Dyandra Entertainment praised the concert for Lopez having toned it down, stating Lopez was "very cooperative ... she respected our culture." Despite this, some fans felt that she should have appeared "the way she is". Han Wei Chou of Channel NewsAsia said that "There really wasn't a single dull moment" at her Singapore concert, calling her performance "thoroughly enjoyable" to the audience who were "screaming in approval". Reviewing her Australian concert, Ross McRae of The West Australian said the audience "went wild" and Lopez "lapped up every minute". He noted that Lopez's vocals were "strong and more than capable recreating the radio and club hits" she performed. McRae also praised her humbleness, noting that she was "actually excited about being on stage performing for her fans, rather than a pop diva." Craig Mathieson from The Sydney Morning Herald wrote that it wasn't as "slick as some pop tours" and lacked "momentum and a definable peak".

== Setlist ==
The following setlist is obtained from the October 5 concert in Lisbon. It is not intended to represent all dates throughout the tour.

1. "Never Gonna Give Up" (Intro)
2. "Get Right"
3. "Love Don't Cost a Thing" (With elements from the "RJ Schoolyard Mix")
4. "I'm Into You"
5. "Waiting for Tonight" (With elements from "Hex's Momentous Club Mix")
6. "Louboutins" (Interlude)
7. "Goin' In"
8. "Back to the Bronx" Medley:
  1. "I'm Real" (Murder Remix)
  2. "All I Have"
  3. "Ain't It Funny" (Murder Remix, with additional elements from "Flava in Ya Ear" by Craig Mack)
9. "Jenny from the Block"
10. "Baby I Love U!" (Interlude)
11. "Hold It Don't Drop It"
12. "Starting Over" (Interlude) (contains elements of "I'm Glad" and "Secretly")
13. "If You Had My Love"
14. "Until It Beats No More"
15. "Let's Get Loud"
16. "Papi"
17. "On the Floor"
  Encore
18. "Dance Again"

== Concert film ==
The Dance Again World Tour was filmed in 3D for an upcoming theatrical film, entitled Dance Again. The film's producer, Simon Fields, described it as a "high energy documentary" that will "combine 3D concert performances with 2D-lensed documentary content, which will be shot during Lopez's world tour on stops in Europe, Asia and Australia". According to Fields, the documentary portion of the film will follow both Lopez's personal and professional life, including "her reflections on her romantic happiness" following her divorce from Marc Anthony. Ality Technica will be handling the 3D production for the movie, while Ted Kenney will direct the 3D shoots. Fields, Benny Medina and Lopez will executive produce the film through Nuyorican Productions. Filming for the film began on the October 5 concert in Lisbon, Portugal. At a point, Lopez confirmed that the film would be released in Spring 2013 without occurring. On December 12, 2014, HBO and HBO Latino announced their plans to air the concert film, Jennifer Lopez: Dance Again, on December 31, 2014. The film also aired for a twenty-four hour marathon from December 31, 2014 to January 1, 2015 on HBO Zone.

== Tour dates ==
List of concerts, showing date, city, country, venue, opening act, tickets sold, number of available tickets and amount of gross revenue
Date	City	Country	Venue	Opening act	Attendance	Revenue
June 14, 2012	Panama City	Panama	Figali Convention Center	—N/a	25,000 / 25,000	—N/a
June 16, 2012	Caracas	Venezuela	Estadio de Fútbol de la Universidad Simón Bolívar	Wisin & Yandel	12,335 / 12,335	$3,977,401
June 19, 2012	Santiago	Chile	Movistar Arena	—N/a	10,000 / 10,000	—N/a
June 21, 2012	Buenos Aires	Argentina	Estadio GEBA	—N/a	—N/a	—N/a
June 23, 2012 (Note: These concerts are a part of the Pop Music Festival.)	São Paulo	Brazil	Arena Anhembi	Ivete Sangalo	30,000 / 30,000	$2,831,284
June 27, 2012	Rio de Janeiro	Brazil	HSBC Arena	Ivete Sangalo	18,000 / 18,000	$1,967,894
June 29, 2012 (Note: These concerts are a part of the Arte Music Festival.)	Fortaleza	Brazil	Centro de Eventos do Ceará	Ivete Sangalo	15,000 / 15,000	$1,415,642
July 1, 2012	Recife	Brazil	Centro de Convenções de Pernambuco	Ivete Sangalo	11,045 / 11,045	$1,075,422
September 23, 2012	Baku	Azerbaijan	Baku Crystal Hall	Emin	22,060 / 22,060	$1,907,439
September 25, 2012	Minsk	Belarus	Minsk Arena	Stooshe	9,752 / 9,752	$1,000,333
September 27, 2012	Gdańsk	Poland	PGE Arena Gdańsk	Stooshe	34,068 / 37,590	$2,269,307
October 5, 2012 (Note: On October 4, 2012, a day prior to the show in Lisbon, Portugal, Lopez performed a free warm-up show for 1,500 fans.)	Lisbon	Portugal	MEO Arena	Stooshe	18,390 / 18,390	$925,202
October 7, 2012	Madrid	Spain	Barclaycard Center	Stooshe	14,000 / 14,000	$980,514
October 10, 2012	Zürich	Switzerland	Hallenstadion	Stooshe	13,000 / 13,000	$1,142,530
October 11, 2012	Bologna	Italy	Unipol Arena	Stooshe	10,420 / 10,828	$989,331
October 13, 2012	Berlin	Germany	O_{2} World	Stooshe	9,296 / 10,711	$949,296
October 14, 2012	Antwerp	Belgium	Sportpaleis	Stooshe	14,610 / 14,704	$1,230,780
October 16, 2012	Paris	France	Palais Omnisports de Paris-Bercy	Stooshe	11,299 / 11,299	$808,450
October 17, 2012	Amnéville	France	Galaxie Amnéville	Stooshe	3,839 / 3,839	$276,685
October 19, 2012	Dublin	Ireland	The O_{2}	Stooshe	3,418 / 3,777	$347,936
October 22, 2012	London	England	The O_{2} Arena	Stooshe	11,047 / 12,840	$1,103,480
October 25, 2012	Munich	Germany	Olympiahalle	Stooshe	7,950 / 7,950	$780,505
October 26, 2012	Prague	Czech Republic	O_{2} Arena Prague	Stooshe	20,000 / 20,000	$1,470,313
October 28, 2012	Hamburg	Germany	O_{2} World Hamburg	Stooshe	9,701 / 10,377	$623,167
October 29, 2012	Rotterdam	Netherlands	Rotterdam Ahoy	Stooshe	16,000 / 16,000	$760,813
October 31, 2012	Oberhausen	Germany	König Pilsener Arena	Stooshe	6,655 / 9,860	$689,137
November 3, 2012	Copenhagen	Denmark	Forum Copenhagen	Stooshe	13,000 / 13,000	$632,619
November 5, 2012	Stockholm	Sweden	Ericsson Globe	Stooshe	5,523 / 5,523	$648,807
November 7, 2012	Helsinki	Finland	Hartwall Arena	Stooshe	10,455 / 10,455	$1,118,340
November 8, 2012	Saint Petersburg	Russia	Ice Palace	Anna Sedokova	13,847 / 13,847	$1,080,369
November 10, 2012	Moscow	Russia	Crocus City Hall	Anna Sedokova	12,660 / 12,660	$2,705,870
November 11, 2012	Moscow	Russia	Crocus City Hall	Anna Sedokova	12,660 / 12,660	$2,705,870
November 13, 2012	Kyiv	Ukraine	Palace of Sports	Stooshe	10,000 / 10,000	$1,096,287
November 14, 2012	Istanbul	Turkey	Ataköy Athletics Arena	Pascal Nouma	5,224 / 5,224	$536,059
November 16, 2012	Istanbul	Turkey	Ülker Arena	Pascal Nouma	30,000 / 30,000	$1,745,553
November 17, 2012	Istanbul	Turkey	Ülker Arena	Pascal Nouma	30,000 / 30,000	$1,745,553
November 18, 2012	Sofia	Bulgaria	Arena Armeets Sofia	Stooshe	13,587 / 13,587	$700,123
November 20, 2012	Belgrade	Serbia	Kombank Arena	Stooshe	18,848 / 18,848	$1,018,746
November 22, 2012	Dubai	United Arab Emirates	Dubai Media City Amphitheatre	—N/a	15,000 / 15,000	—N/a
November 24, 2012	Shanghai	China	Mercedes-Benz Arena	—N/a	7,784 / 7,784	$1,161,788
November 26, 2012	Pasay	Philippines	Mall of Asia Arena	—N/a	15,000/ 15,000	$2,307,709
November 28, 2012	Hong Kong		AsiaWorld–Arena	—N/a	10,000 / 10,000	$1,193,592
November 30, 2012	Jakarta	Indonesia	Mata Elang International Stadium	—N/a	8,130 / 8,130	$1,649,675
December 2, 2012	Kuala Lumpur	Malaysia	Stadium Merdeka	—N/a	6,067 / 6,067	$809,117
December 4, 2012	Singapore		The Meadow	—N/a	15,000 / 15,000	$1,190,116
December 6, 2012	Perth	Australia	Perth Arena	Kate Alexa	8,193 / 9,345	$1,400,780
December 9, 2012	Adelaide	Australia	Adelaide Entertainment Centre	Kate Alexa	7,000 / 7,000	—N/a
December 11, 2012	Melbourne	Australia	Rod Laver Arena	Kate Alexa	20,500 / 20,500	$2,929,720
December 12, 2012	Melbourne	Australia	Rod Laver Arena	Kate Alexa	20,500 / 20,500	$2,929,720
December 14, 2012	Sydney	Australia	Qudos Bank Arena	Kate Alexa	21,780 / 21,780	$3,469,040
December 15, 2012	Sydney	Australia	Qudos Bank Arena	Kate Alexa	21,780 / 21,780	$3,469,040
December 18, 2012	Brisbane	Australia	Brisbane Entertainment Centre	Kate Alexa	6,047 / 6,047	$1,050,730
December 21, 2012	San Juan	Puerto Rico	José Miguel Agrelot Coliseum	—N/a	25,125 / 25,125	$2,224,511
December 22, 2012	San Juan	Puerto Rico	José Miguel Agrelot Coliseum	—N/a	25,125 / 25,125	$2,224,511
Total					604,335 / 625,275 (96.6%)	$60,192,412

== Cancelled shows ==
List of cancelled concerts, showing date, city, country, venue, and reason for cancellation
Date	City	Country	Venue	Reason for cancellation
October 23, 2012	Manchester	England	Manchester Arena	Unknown
November 14, 2012	Bucharest	Romania	Romexpo	Unfulfilled stage requirements

== Credits ==
Credits adapted from the Dance Again World Tour program booklet.

Performance and band

- Jennifer Lopez – Artist, creative director
- Gilbert Saldivar – Dance captain
- Jose Hernandez – Dancer
- Felix Crego - Dancer
- Cat Rendic – Dancer
- George Jones, Jr. – Dancer
- Jimmy Smith – Dancer
- Chase Benz – Dancer
- John Silver – Dancer
- Shannon Holtzapffel – Dancer
- Tera Perez – Dancer
- Lake Smits – Dancer
- Bryant Siono – Bass
- Adam Hawley – Guitar
- Carnell Harrell – Key 1
- Norman Jackson – Key 2
- Charles Streeter – Drums
- Fausto Cuevas III – Percussionist
- Erin Stevenson – BGV1
- Belle Johnson – BGV1

Production

- Benny Medina – Executive producer, management
- Beau "Casper" Smart – Co-creative director, supervising choreographer
- Kim Burse – Music director
- Sean Burke – Production Designer, Lighting, Stage Set, Video
- Thaddis "Kuk" Harrell – Sound design and production
- Dago Gonzalez – Video content creative director
- Tiana Rios – Producer (Nuyorican films)
- Ana Carbollosa – Tour photographer
- J.R. Taylor – Choreographer: "Dance Again", "Love Don't Cost a Thing", "Waiting for Tonight"
- Liz Imperio;- Choreographer: "Show Intro", "Let's Get Loud", "Que Hiceste"
- Parris Goebel – Choreographer: "Back to the Bronx" medley, "Goin' In"
- Mariel Haenn – Stylist and costume design
- Rob Zangardi – Stylist and costume design
- Kelly Johnson – Wardrobe supervisor
- Zuhair Murad – Costume design and fabrication
- Lorenzo Martin – Hair stylist
- Mary Phillips – Make-up artist
- Geetanjali "Gilly" Lyer – Management, tour programme supervisor
- Mark Young – Publicist
- Michael Dermen – Executive assistant to Benny Medina
- Cassandra Krcmar – Executive assistant to Benny Medina
- Debbi "Summer Izzard" – Executive assistant to Lopez
- Yari Hernandez – Assistant to Lopez
- Day Ryan – Assistant to Lopez
- Yvetta Young – Music and band coordinator
- Carmen Romero – Masseuse
- Gus A Zambrano – Chief security
- Raul Ibanez – Security
- Diego Scalia – Security
- Marco Battini – Security
- Brendon Johnston – Strength and conditioning coach
- Ana Carbollosa – Tour programme photographer
- Steven Gomillion – Photographer
- Dennis Leupold – Photographer
- Mario Testino – Photographer
- Kevin Mazur – Photographer
- Mr. Scott Design – Tour program layout and design
- Alexis Gudilino – Director of tour documentary

Crew

- Steve Brumbach – Tour manager
- Jon Martin – Tour accountant
- Lauren Abderrahman – Road manager
- Nancy Ghosh – Advance team
- Omar Abderrahman – Production manager
- Carl Clasulli – Stage manager
- Eric Piontkowski – Assistant stage manager
- Lauren Temple – Production Coordinator
- Dillan Esco – Production Coordinator
- Marley Engebretsen – Dressing room coordinator
- Jill Focke – Head of wardrobe
- Skylar Christensen – Wardrobe assistant
- Matt Hammond – Props
- Scott Christensen – Carpenter
- Joe Rogers – Carpenter
- Marty Zilio – Carpenter
- Brian Benauer – Carpenter
- James Ford – Carpenter
- Art McConnell – Rigger
- Jeremy Benauer – Rigger
- Eric Camp – FOH Engineer
- Vish Wadi – Monitor engineer
- Mike Monteiro – Playback/Pro Tools engineer
- Paul Jump – Audio
- Jennifer Smala – Audio
- Ricardo Roman – Audio
- Adam Collins – Audio
- John Ciasulli – Guitar tech
- Ed Faris – Keyboard tech
- Joe Addington – Drum tech
- James Such – Lightning
- Ken Burns – Lightning
- Mark England – Lightning
- Gareth Morgan – Lightning
- Dave Prior – Lightning
- Mark Weil – Lightning
- Andrew Williamson – Lightning
- Rob Darcy – Video
- Zach Peletz – Video
- Alex Keene – Video
- Allison Sulock – Video
- Nick Strand – Video
- Scott Williamson – Video
- Bruce Ramos – Video
- Paul Maddock-Jones – Video
- Steve Aleff – Pyro
- Travis Jameson – Pyro
- William Ingato – Pyro
- Scott Cunningham – Lasers
- Courtney Keene – Catering
- William Perez – Cat Power
- Craig McCulloch – Bravado merchandise vendor

== See also ==
- List of highest-grossing concert tours by Latin artists
