= Get It Poppin' =

Get It Poppin' may refer to:

- "Get It Poppin'" (Fat Joe song) (2005), a song featuring Nelly
- "Get It Poppin'", a song by JoJo from The High Road (2006)
