= So Much More (song) =

Single by Fat Joe

from the album All or Nothing
- Released: March 29, 2005
- Recorded: 2005
- Genre: Hip hop
- Length: 3:58
- Label: Terror Squad, Atlantic
- Songwriters: Joe Cartegena, Andre Lyon, Marcello Valenzano, Roger Troutman, Larry Troutman, Shirley Murdock
- Producer: Cool & Dre

Fat Joe singles chronology
"Hold You Down" (2005)	"So Much More" (2005)	"Get It Poppin'" (2005)

"So Much More" is a song by American rapper Fat Joe, released as the first single from his sixth studio album, All or Nothing (2005). It was produced by Cool & Dre, who helped write the song with Joe. Lyrically, the song features Joe describing his personal advantages in several areas, including his "hood buzz", among other features.

"So Much More" performed modestly on the charts, peaking at number 81 on the US Billboard Hot 100 and also charting on several Billboard component charts, although it failed to appear on any major chart outside the United States. The song received generally positive reviews from music critics, many of whom commended Cool & Dre's production, although some were ambivalent towards Joe's lyrics.

== Background and composition ==
"So Much More" was written by Fat Joe and production duo Cool & Dre, with the song's production also handled by the latter. It was released as a 12" single in the United States on March 1, 2005, and was later sent to urban contemporary radio in the United States on March 29, with its release to mainstream radio following on April 5.

"So Much More" is a hip hop song of three minutes and fifty eight seconds in length, backed by a "bumping beat and distinctive synth whine" provided by Cool & Dre. It contains samples of the songs "Bang Bang" by Vanilla Fudge, "Computer Love" by Zapp & Roger and "Gasolina" by Daddy Yankee, although only Zapp are credited for having written the song in the liner notes of All or Nothing. It is listed at number four on the album's track listing. Whilst Joe raps all of the song's verses, he sings the chorus. RapReviews.com writer Steve Juon described the backing track as "insistent, hypnotic and infectious", also noting that the song had crossover potential.

Lyrically, the song contains references to themes such as the death of former Terror Squad member Big Pun, Joe's personal reputation in "the hood" and his ability to fight when necessary.

== Critical reception ==
"So Much More" received generally positive reviews from music critics, with several praising Cool & Dre's production. Al Shipley of Stylus Magazine praised the song's production by Cool & Dre, describing the backing track as "bumping". RapReviews.com writer Steve Juon called "So Much More" "one of the hardest so-called crossover songs to hit the top of the charts in a long time", noting that the song's quality meant that "[All or Nothing] had some pretty high expectations riding in because of the two lead singles" ("So Much More" and the following single "Get It Poppin'", a collaboration with rapper Nelly). Juon praised the song's lyrics as "hardcore, and fuckin' funny as hell to boot", and also commended Joe's decision to sing the chorus, noting that although this was surprising, Joe is "a lot better at it [singing] than I am". Allmusic writer Andy Kellman named "So Much More" as one of the best songs on the album, along with "Safe 2 Say (The Incredible)", "Temptation Pt. 2" and "Everybody Get Up".

However, Evan McGarvey of The Michigan Daily criticized Joe's performance, writing that "his [Joe] does his best to scar" the song "with Bad-Ass-Rap-101-level verses", although he praised the song's "church-organ loop" production. In her review of All or Nothing, Alexis Kirke of musicOMH wrote that the song was "a track to ignore" and that "the skip should be kept handy" before listening.

== Track listing ==
US 12" single

1. "So Much More" (Radio Version) – 3:59

== Charts ==
Chart (2005)	Peak position
US Billboard Hot 100	81
US Hot R&B/Hip-Hop Songs (Billboard)	34
US Hot Rap Songs (Billboard)	18
US Pop 100 (Billboard)	85

== Radio and release history ==
Country	Date	Format	Label
United States	March 1, 2005	Vinyl single	Atlantic Records
United States	March 29, 2005	Urban contemporary radio	Atlantic Records
United States	April 5, 2005	Mainstream radio	Atlantic Records
