= Ras Baalbek (Rock Shelter) =

Rock shelter in Lebanon

- ar: رأس بعلبك (مأوى صخري أثري)
- location in Lebanon
- 34.259912°N 36.423723°E
- Type: Rock Shelter
- Periods: PPNB
- Cultures: Neolithic
- Location: 26 km (16 mi) North-east of Baalbek
- Region: Bekaa Valley

Site notes
- Excavation dates: 1965–1966, 1970
- Archaeologists: Lorraine Copeland, Peter Wescombe, Jacques Besançon
- Condition: Ruins
- Public access: Yes

Ras Baalbek I (Arabic: رأس بعلبك) is a rock shelter 500 m (1,600 ft) east of Ras Baalbek in the northern Beqaa Valley in Lebanon. It sits north of the Wadi Teniyet er-Râs valley at a height of 1,000 m (3,300 ft). It was first discovered by Lorraine Copeland and Peter Wescombe in 1965–1966. It was later excavated by Jacques Besançon in 1970. Retouched blades along with a pressure-flaked arrowhead and a burin were found dated to the Neolithic period.
