= Zuhair Murad =

Lebanese fashion designer

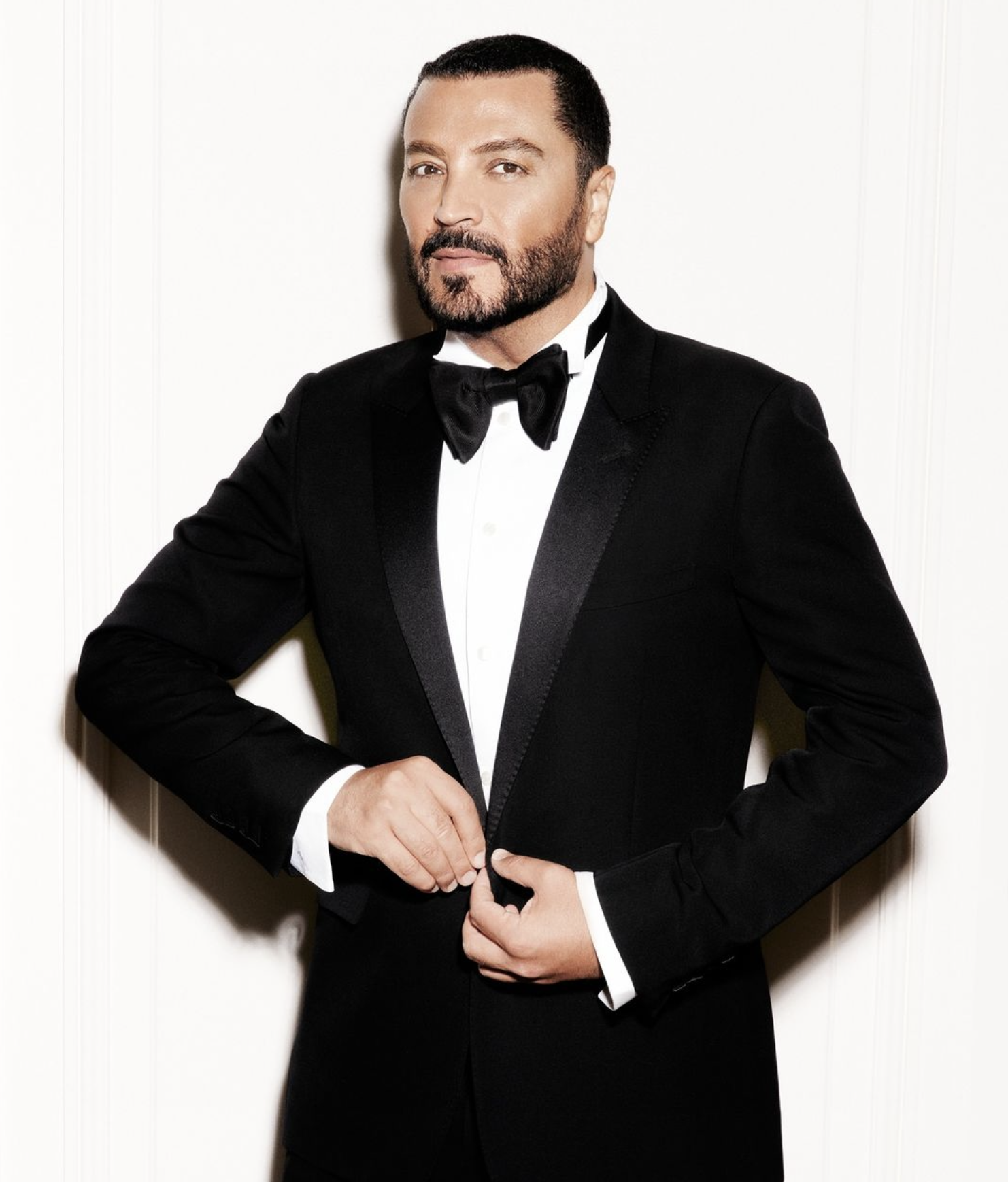
- Zuhair Murad, Beirut, 2024
- Born: Baalbek, Lebanon
- Label: Zuhair Murad
- Website: https://www.zuhairmurad.com

Zuhair Murad (Arabic: زهير مراد) is a Lebanese fashion designer and stylist, born in Ras Baalbek, Lebanon. He launched his brand in 1995 and became a regular at Paris Haute Couture Week from 2001. His designs have been worn by global celebrities at major red carpet events, earning him international acclaim.

== Biography ==
Murad was born in a Melkite Catholic family in Ras Baalbek. After finishing high school, he moved to Paris, where he obtained his fashion degree.

In 1995, Murad expanded his presence in Beirut by opening a third flagship store. Prior to this, he had launched boutiques and showrooms on Charles Helou Avenue in Beirut and rue François I in Paris. He later established a showroom in Milan on Via Borgogna. In 1999, he debuted a collection on the runways of Rome, which contributed to his inclusion in the Italian fashion calendar.

Celebrities such as Adele, Marion Cotillard, Taylor Swift, Alicia Lyngaas, Carrie Underwood, Ivana Trump, Cheryl Fernandez-Versini, Beyoncé Knowles, Jennifer Lopez, Kellie Pickler, Najwa Karam, Shakira, Katy Perry, Christina Applegate, Vanessa Williams, and Ana Ortiz have wore his designs. Priyanka Chopra wore a white embellished strapless gown designed by Murad at her Oscars debut in 2016. Miley Cyrus was seen sporting one of his creations at the Academy Awards; Christina Aguilera and Jennifer Lopez wore his designs at the 2011 Golden Globe Awards.

At the 2010 Emmy Awards, Nina Dobrev, Christina Aguilera, Wanda Sykes, and singer Jewel were spotted wearing Zuhair Murad dresses. Kerry Washington wore one of his gowns at the 2011 Emmy Awards. Princess al-Taweel of Saudi Arabia wore his creation when she attended the wedding of Prince William and Catherine, Duchess of Cambridge.

Blake Lively wore a Zuhair Murad dress from his Spring 2012, Couture collection at the worldwide premiere of her movie Savages at Westwood Village. She wore a Murad dress in the 8th episode of the fourth season of Gossip Girl entitled "Juliet Doesn't Live Here Anymore." Kristen Stewart wore a Murad dress at the 2012 Toronto Film Festival for a screening of her 2012 film, On the Road, and at the premiere in Los Angeles of her film, The Twilight Saga: Breaking Dawn – Part 2.

French actress Marion Cotillard also wore a floral Murad dress from his Fall 2012, collection at the 2013 Critics' Choice Awards.

Jennifer Lopez wore a gown from Murad’s Spring/Summer 2024 Couture line at the premiere of "Wicked" in Los Angeles in November 2024.

Blake Lively donned a Zuhair Murad gown at the Time 100 Gala in April 2025, celebrating her inclusion in Time's list of the most influential people.
