= All or Nothing (Fat Joe album) =

Studio album by Fat Joe
- Released: June 14, 2005
- Studio: Jerusalem Studios (Miami, FL); The Record Room (Miami, FL); Baseline Recording Studios (New York, NY); Sound on Sound Studios (New York, NY); Battery Studios (New York, NY); Lil Jon's Crib (Miami, FL); Stankonia Recordings (Atlanta, GA)
- Genre: Hip hop
- Length: 63:10
- Label: TS; Atlantic
- Producer: Cool & Dre; DJ Khaled; Just Blaze; Lil' Jon; LV; Nasty Beatmakers; Scott Storch; StreetRunner; Swizz Beatz; The Runners; Timbaland

Fat Joe chronology
Loyalty (2002)	All or Nothing (2005)	Me, Myself & I (2006)

Singles from All or Nothing
- 1. "So Much More" Released: March 1, 2005; 2. "Get It Poppin'" Released: May 29, 2005

All or Nothing is the sixth solo studio album by American rapper Fat Joe. It was released on June 14, 2005, through Atlantic Records, making it his fourth and final studio album for the label. Originally scheduled to be released in November 2004 under the title Things of that Nature, but owing to his dispute with 50 Cent, changed the album to All or Nothing and released June the following year.

Recording sessions took place at Jerusalem Studios, The Record Room and Lil Jon's Crib in Miami, at Baseline Recording Studios, Sound on Sound Studios and Battery Studios in New York City, and at Stankonia Recordings in Atlanta.

Production was handled by Cool & Dre, DJ Khaled, StreetRunner, Just Blaze, Lil Jon, L.V., Nasty Beatmakers, Scott Storch, Swizz Beatz, The Runners and Timbaland. It features guest appearances from Eminem, Jennifer Lopez, Lil Jon, Mase, Mashonda, Nelly, Remy Ma and R. Kelly.

The album received generally positive reviews from music critics. All or Nothing debuted at number six on the Billboard 200 and number two on the Top R&B/Hip-Hop Albums, selling 106,500 copies in the first week in the United States. It was preceded with two charted singles: "So Much More" and "Get It Poppin'".

== Critical reception ==
Professional ratings
Review scores
Source	Rating
AllMusic	3/5 stars
The Guardian	2/5 stars
HipHopDX	3/5 stars
IGN	(6.7/10)
musicOMH	(favorable)
RapReviews	(8/10)
Rolling Stone	3/5 stars
Spin	B+
Stylus Magazine	B−
USA Today	3/4 stars

Steve 'Flash' Juon of RapReviews found the record to be much more than its first two singles, praising the beats for emitting a fiery energy throughout the track listing and Joe's performance for being similar to The Notorious B.I.G. in terms of delivering both crossover radio singles and hardcore bangers, concluding that "Fat Joe is nobody's joke any more - he goes for "All or Nothing" on this album and in doing so even serves notice to competitors for that dapper throne that it's not 50's to own. I think it's safe to say he doubled up on the bet". AllMusic's Andy Kellman said it was similar to previous projects that Joe had done in the early 2000s and gave note to Cool & Dre's work being up to par with their more well-known contemporaries, concluding that "While [Fat] Joe has yet to come up with a landmark album, he also hasn't released a dud since his 1993 debut". Christian Hoard of Rolling Stone was concerned about the vast producers and guest artists throughout the album but said that Joe's macho persona and no-frills lyricism had enough variations to carry it. Spin credited the record for Just Blaze's production on "Safe 2 Say" and the Nelly collaboration "Get It Poppin'", calling it "A best-yet mix of the New York hardcore hip-hop that keeps this 50 Cent rival vital and the radio-friendly floor fillers that pad his bank account".

A writer for HipHopDX commended the album for having standout party bangers and street tracks courtesy of Cool & Dre but felt the overall package was below the standards Joe set for himself against 50 Cent and G-Unit, concluding that "With the diverse variety of production and A-List features on All or Nothing it's safe to say that it could have been so, so much more". Jim During of IGN saw promise in the record because of Just Blaze and Cool & Dre's contributions in the first-half, and Mase and Eminem's guest verses on the "Lean Back" remix, but said it loses that energy when it moves towards the crossover singles. Entertainment Weekly writer Nick Marino commented on the lack of cohesiveness in Joe's musicianship, saying "he can’t quite integrate his machismo and vulnerability into seamless artistry". He concluded that "the result is a choppy gangsta party record, laced with sweetness". Dorian Lynskey of The Guardian felt the track listing was nothing more than a typical rapper's checklist, and found Joe's rhymes on "Lean Back (Remix)" to be "workmanlike plod" compared to Eminem's, calling All or Nothing a "makeweight mainstream hip hop album".

== Commercial performance ==
All or Nothing debuted at number six on the US Billboard 200 chart, 106,000 copies in its first week. This became Joe's second US top-ten debut. The album also debuted at number two on the US Top R&B/Hip-Hop Albums chart, becoming Joe's fourth top-ten album on this chart. As of July 2006, the album has sold 293,000 copies in the United States, according to Nielsen SoundScan.

== Track listing ==
No.	Title	Writer(s)	Producer(s)	Length
1.	"Intro"	Joseph Cartagena; Nicholas Warwar; Walter Sigler; Joseph Jefferson	StreetRunner	3:37
2.	"Does Anybody Know"	Cartagena; Allan Felder; Kenneth Gamble; Norman Harris	Nasty Beatmakers; The Runners	4:41
3.	"Safe 2 Say (The Incredible)"	Cartagena; Justin Smith; Carlton Douglas Ridenhour; Keith M. Boxley; Eric T. Sadler	Just Blaze	4:01
4.	"So Much More"	Cartagena; Andre Lyon; Marcello Valenzano; Shirley Murdock; Larry Troutman; Roger Troutman	Cool & Dre	3:58
5.	"My Fofo"	Cartagena; Lyon; Valenzano; William Hanna; Joseph Barbera; Hoyt Curtin	Cool & Dre	3:55
6.	"Rock Ya Body"	Cartagena; Lyon; Valenzano; Mohandas Dewese; Bobby Robinson	Cool & Dre	3:52
7.	"Listen Baby" (featuring Mashonda)	Cartagena; Mashonda Tifrere-Dean; Kaseem Dean; Nickolas Ashford; Valerie Simpson; Michael Cooper; Felton Pilate	Swizz Beatz	3:35
8.	"Get It Poppin'" (featuring Nelly)	Cartagena; Scott Storch	Scott Storch	3:25
9.	"Temptation, Pt. 1"	Cartagena; Khaled Khaled	DJ Khaled	3:25
10.	"Temptation, Pt. 2"	Cartagena; Levar Coppin; Serge Gainsbourg; Franck Langolff	L.V.	4:12
11.	"Everybody Get Up"	Cartagena; Timothy Z. Mosley; William J. Drayton; Boxley; Sadler; William Earl Collins; George Clinton Jr.; Bernard G. Worrell	Timbaland	4:20
12.	"I Can Do U"	Cartagena; Lyon; Valenzano	Cool & Dre	3:36
13.	"So Hot" (featuring R. Kelly)	Cartagena; Lyon; Valenzano	Cool & Dre	3:27
14.	"Lean Back Remix" (featuring Mase, Eminem, Remy Ma and Lil Jon)	Cartagena; Mason Betha; Marshall Mathers; Reminisce Smith; Jonathan Smith; Storch	Lil Jon	4:50
15.	"Beat Novacane"	Cartagena; Khaled	DJ Khaled	3:44
16.	"Hold You Down" (featuring Jennifer Lopez)	Cartagena; Warwar	StreetRunner	7:04
Total length:				1:03:12

Sample credits

- Track 1 contains elements of "If and When" written by Walter Sigler and Joseph Jefferson as performed by The Three Degrees.
- Track 2 contains elements of "Joe" written by Allan Felder, Kenneth Gamble and Norman Harris as performed by Jackie Moore.
- Track 3 contains excerpts from the composition and sound recording "The Incredible (A Cappella)" written by Carlton Douglas Ridenhour, Keith M. Boxley and Eric T. Salder as performed by Public Enemy.
- Track 4 contains a sample of "Bang Bang" by Vanilla Fudge and interpolations from the composition "Computer Love" written by Shirley Murdock, Larry Troutman and Roger Troutman.
- Track 5 contains elements of "Flintstones Theme Song" written by William Hanna, Joseph Barbera and Hoyt Curtin.
- Track 6 contains resung elements from the composition "Body Rock" written by Mohandas Dewese and Bobby Robinson.
- Track 7 contains a sample of the recording "Ain't No Mountain High Enough" as performed by Marvin Gaye and Tammi Terrell, and samples from the composition "Love Train" written by Michael Cooper and Felton Pilate as performed by Con Funk Shun.
- Track 10 contains samples from the composition "Je T'aime" written by Serge Gainsbourg and Franck Langolff as performed by St. Tropez.
- Track 11 contains interpolations from the composition "911 Is a Joke" written by William J. Drayton, Keith M. Boxley, Eric T. Sadler, Earl Collins, George Clinton Jr. and Bernard G. Worrell.

== Personnel ==
- Joseph "Fat Joe" Cartagena — vocals, executive producer
- Mashonda Tifrere-Dean — vocals (track 7)
- Cornell "Nelly" Haynes Jr. — vocals (track 8)
- Robert Kelly — vocals (track 13)
- Mason "Mase" Betha — vocals (track 14)
- Marshall "Eminem" Mathers — vocals (track 14)
- Reminisce "Remy Ma" Smith — vocals (track 14)
- Jonathan "Lil Jon" Smith — vocals & producer (track 14)
- Jennifer Lopez — vocals (track 16)
- Jackie Rubio — additional vocals (track 8)
- Lenny "LVM" Mollings — guitar & producer (track 2)
- Wilber "Mayne" Martin — keyboards (track 2)
- Justin "Just Blaze" Smith — scratches & producer (track 3)
- Donnie Lyle — guitar (track 13)
- Craig Love — guitar (track 14)
- LaMarquis Jefferson — bass (track 14)
- Scott Storch — keyboards (track 14), producer (track 8)
- Rob Mac — keyboards (track 14)
- Nicholas "Streetrunner" Warwar — producer (tracks: 1, 16)
- Johnny David "DJ Nasty" Mollings — producer (track 2)
- Andrew Harr — producer (track 2)
- Jermaine Jackson — producer (track 2)
- Andre Lyon — producer (tracks: 4–6, 12, 13), executive producer
- Marcello Valenzano — producer (tracks: 4–6, 12, 13), executive producer
- Kaseem "Swizz Beatz" Dean — producer (track 7)
- DJ Khaled — producer (tracks: 9, 15), executive producer
- Levar "LV" Coppin — producer (track 10)
- Timothy "Timbaland" Mosley — producer (track 11)
- Adrian "Drop" Santalla — recording (tracks: 1, 7, 9–11, 14–16)
- Ken "Duro" Ifill — mixing (tracks: 1, 2, 4, 6, 9, 10, 12, 15, 16)
- Javier Valverde — mixing assistant (tracks: 1, 9, 10, 15, 16)
- Robert "Big Brizz" Brisbane — recording (tracks: 2, 4, 5, 8, 12, 13)
- Patrick Johnson — mixing assistant (tracks: 2, 4, 5, 12, 13)
- David Brown — recording (track 3)
- Gimel "Young Guru" Keaton — mixing (track 3)
- Scott Kieklak — mixing (track 5)
- Joe Yannece — mastering (track 5)
- Brian Lodato — recording (track 6)
- Reed Taylor — recording assistant (track 6)
- Josh Copp — recording assistant (track 7)
- Chris Theis — mixing (track 7)
- Arnold Mischkulnig — mixing assistant (track 7)
- Serban Ghenea — mixing (tracks: 8, 13)
- John Hanes — additional Pro Tools engineering (track 8)
- Tim Roberts — additional Pro Tools engineering assistant (track 8)
- Jimmy Douglass — recording (track 11)
- John Frye — recording & mixing (track 14)
- Mark Vinten — recording (track 14)
- Chris Gehringer — mastering
- Greg Gigendad Burke — art direction, design
- Rage Johnson — illustration
- Olaf Heine — photography
- Rob "Reef" Tewlow — A&R
- Sam "Bino" Taylor — A&R
- Anne DeClemente — A&R
- Deborah Mannis-Gardner — sample clearances

== Charts ==
=== Weekly charts ===
Weekly chart performance
Chart (2005)	Peak position
Australian Hitseekers Albums (ARIA)	8
Australian Urban Albums (ARIA)	25
Canadian Albums (Nielsen SoundScan)	35
French Albums (SNEP)	127
Swiss Albums (Schweizer Hitparade)	59
UK Albums (OCC)	172
UK R&B Albums (OCC)	16
US Billboard 200	6
US Top R&B/Hip-Hop Albums (Billboard)	2

=== Year-end charts ===
Year-end chart performance
Chart (2005)	Position
US Top R&B/Hip-Hop Albums (Billboard)	99
