= Hold You Down (Jennifer Lopez song) =

2005 single by Jennifer Lopez

Single by Jennifer Lopez featuring Fat Joe

from the album Rebirth
- A-side: "Get Right"
- Released: February 15, 2005
- Studio: Cove City Sound (Glen Cove); The Poolhouse (Long Island); Sony Music (New York City)
- Length: 4:36 (album version); 3:55 (radio edit)
- Label: Epic
- Songwriters: Gregory Christopher; Makeba Riddick; Joe Cartagena; Cory Rooney; Gregory Bruno; Larry Troutman; Billy Beck
- Producers: Nyce Boy; Gregory Bruno; Cory Rooney

Jennifer Lopez singles chronology
"Get Right" (2005)	"Hold You Down" (2005)	"Control Myself" (2006)

Fat Joe singles chronology
"New York" (2004)	"Hold You Down" (2005)	"So Much More" (2005)

Music video
- "Hold You Down" on YouTube

"Hold You Down" is a song by American singer Jennifer Lopez for her fourth studio album, Rebirth (2005). Written by Gregory "Nyce Boy" Christopher, Makeba Riddick, Fat Joe (who is also the featured artist), Cory Rooney, Gregory Bruno and produced by Christopher, Bruno and Rooney, "Hold You Down" hit number six on the UK Singles Chart, and reached the top-40 in many other countries. "Hold You Down" samples Shirley Murdock's 1986 song "As We Lay", which was written by Larry Troutman of the funk band Zapp, and keyboardist Billy Beck of Ohio Players.

The song is the third collaboration between Lopez and Joe, after "Feelin' So Good" (1999) with Big Pun, and "Love Don't Cost a Thing (RJ Schoolyard Mix)" (2002). They teamed up once again in 2014 on Joe's song "Stressin'".

Following the success of "Get Right", "Hold You Down" could not attain its predecessor's success in the United States and was therefore deemed a commercial failure there, as the song peaked at number 64 on the Billboard Hot 100 despite its international success. As of June 25, 2018, the single has sold 440,000 digital copies in the US.

== Background ==
After the moderate success of Rebirth's lead single "Get Right", "Hold You Down" was chosen as its second single. Critics and fans alike criticized this move, considering the general lukewarm reception of the song. "Hold You Down" was also included on Fat Joe's album All or Nothing (2005). A remix with Don Omar is included on his compilation album Da Hitman Presents Reggaetón Latino (2005).

== Composition ==
"Hold You Down" is a song with a length of four minutes and thirty-two seconds (4:32). The song samples Shirley Murdock's "As We Lay". According to Lopez, the track was a "last minute" add to Rebirth. While listening to the song, she knew that "there's nobody" that she can do the song with "except Fat Joe". Lopez called Fat Joe up immediately and the next day, the song was recorded after he created his own rap verses.

Describing the lyrics for "Hold You Down", Fat Joe said, "It's more like a friendship record, you know what I mean? Growing up in the Bronx and how we became who we are, but we still keep it real with each other. We don't talk every day, but we got mad love for each other whenever we see each other. It's always crazy love." According to Entertainment Weekly, the song is about "how true she's [Lopez] been to her hood." "Hold You Down" consists of a flat beat and "some tinkling" chimes in the background, which according to Sam Shepherd from musicOMH, "wouldn't be out of place on a Christmas single."

== Critical response ==
The song received most mixed reviews from music critics. musicOMH's Sam Shepherd wrote, "The lyrics are sweet but not sickly so, and Fat Joe's appearance doesn't sound like he's co-opted the track - instead he allows Lopez's voice room to breathe; and who would have guessed it, she may have an asset that is more impressive than her booty."

Mike Schiller from PopMatters called it "ill-fated" and "milquetoast". David Browne of Entertainment Weekly commented that "even with Fat Joe pitching in, the song is as colorless as Lopez's voice."

== Music video ==
Prior to the video's release, Lopez told MTV News that "I'll be very real". The music video for "Hold You Down" was directed by Diane Martel and edited by Paul Martínez. It was released on March 7, 2005. In The Bronx, New York City, Lopez is seen singing on top of a building and in a hallway, while Fat Joe is seen roaming the streets.

== Track listings ==
- Australian CD maxi single
1. "Hold You Down" featuring Fat Joe (Radio Edit) — 3:55
2. "Hold You Down" featuring Fat Joe (Cory Rooney Spring Mix) — 4:51
3. "Hold You Down" featuring Don Omar (The Eliel Mix) — 4:02
4. "Hold You Down" featuring Don Omar (SPK and DJ Lobo Remix) — 3:59
- European CD single
1. "Hold You Down" featuring Fat Joe (Radio Edit) — 3:55
2. "Hold You Down" featuring Fat Joe (Cory Rooney Spring Clean Mix) — 4:51
- European CD maxi single
1. "Hold You Down" featuring Fat Joe (Album Version) — 4:36
2. "Hold You Down" featuring Don Omar (The Eliel Mix) — 4:02
3. "Hold You Down" featuring Don Omar (SPK and DJ Lobo Remix) — 3:59
4. "Get Right" featuring Fabolous (Hip Hop Remix) — 3:47
5. "Hold You Down" featuring Fat Joe (Video)
- European 12-inch vinyl
1. "Hold You Down" featuring Fat Joe (Cory Rooney Spring Clean Edit Mix) — 4:22
2. "Hold You Down" featuring Fat Joe (Cory Rooney Spring Instrumental Mix) — 4:51
3. "Hold You Down" featuring Fat Joe (Album Version) — 4:36
4. "Hold You Down" featuring Don Omar (The Eliel Mix) — 4:02
5. "Hold You Down" featuring Don Omar (SPK and DJ Lobo Remix) — 3:59
6. "Hold You Down" featuring Don Omar (The Eliel Instrumental Mix) — 4:02
- US 12-inch vinyl
1. "Hold You Down" featuring Fat Joe (Album Version) — 4:36
2. "Hold You Down" (Instrumental) — 4:36
- 12-inch vinyl (Remixes)
1. "Hold You Down" featuring Fat Joe (Cory Rooney Spring Edit Mix) — 4:22
2. "Hold You Down" featuring Fat Joe (Cory Rooney Spring Instrumental Mix) — 4:51
3. "Hold You Down" featuring Don Omar (SPK and DJ Lobo Remix) — 3:59
4. "Hold You Down" featuring Don Omar (The Eliel Mix) — 4:02

== Charts ==
=== Weekly charts ===
Chart (2005)	Peak position
Australia (ARIA)	17
Australian Urban (ARIA)	8
Belgium (Ultratop 50 Flanders)	44
Belgium Dance (Ultratop Flanders)	7
Belgium (Ultratip Bubbling Under Wallonia)	2
Belgium Dance (Ultratop Wallonia)	7
European Hot 100 Singles (Billboard)	24
Germany (GfK)	44
Greece (IFPI)	9
Guatemala (Notimex)	3
Ireland (IRMA)	15
Italy (FIMI)	22
Netherlands (Dutch Top 40)	38
Netherlands (Single Top 100)	26
New Zealand (Recorded Music NZ)	14
Scotland Singles (Official Charts)	13
Spain (Promusicae)	12
Switzerland (Schweizer Hitparade)	44
UK Singles (Official Charts)	6
UK Hip Hop/R&B (Official Charts)	4
US Billboard Hot 100	64
US Pop Airplay (Billboard)	27
US Pop Airplay (Billboard) Spring mix	39
US Rhythmic Airplay (Billboard)	34

=== Year-end charts ===
Chart (2005)	Position
Romania (Romanian Top 100)	47
UK Singles (OCC)	120

== Release history ==
Region	Date	Format	Label
United States	February 15, 2005	Digital download (1-track)	Epic
United States	February 15, 2005	Mainstream airplay	Epic
Canada	March 15, 2005	Digital download (1-track)	Epic
Ireland	April 15, 2005	Digital download (1-track)	Epic
United Kingdom	April 15, 2005	Digital download (1-track)	Epic
Norway	May 10, 2005	Digital download (4-track)	Epic
Belgium	May 13, 2005	Digital download (4-track)	Epic
Germany	May 13, 2005	Digital download (4-track)	Epic
Ireland	May 13, 2005	Digital download (4-track)	Epic
Luxembourg	May 13, 2005	Digital download (4-track)	Epic
Netherlands	May 13, 2005	Digital download (4-track)	Epic
Portugal	May 13, 2005	Digital download (4-track)	Epic
Switzerland	May 13, 2005	Digital download (4-track)	Epic
Spain	May 16, 2005	Digital download (4-track)	Epic
United Kingdom	May 16, 2005	Digital download (4-track)	Epic
United Kingdom	May 16, 2005	CD single	Epic
Canada	May 24, 2005	Digital download (4-track)	Epic
Sweden	May 25, 2005	Digital download (2-track)	Epic
Germany	May 30, 2005	CD single	Epic
Belgium	May 30, 2005	Digital download (2-track)	Epic
Luxembourg	May 30, 2005	Digital download (2-track)	Epic
Netherlands	May 30, 2005	Digital download (2-track)	Epic
Norway	May 30, 2005	Digital download (2-track)	Epic
Switzerland	May 30, 2005	Digital download (2-track)	Epic
Australia	June 13, 2005	CD single	Epic
