= Until It Beats No More =

Song by Jennifer Lopez

from the album Love?
- Studio: Pulse (Los Angeles)
- Genre: Soft rock
- Length: 3:52
- Label: Island
- Songwriters: Troy Johnson; Evan Bogart; Jörgen Elofsson
- Producers: Radio; Kuk Harrell

Audio video
- "Until It Beats No More" on YouTube

"Until It Beats No More" is a song recorded by American entertainer Jennifer Lopez for her seventh studio album, Love? (2011). It was written by Evan Bogart and Jörgen Elofsson, with its producer Troy "Radio" Johnson. The song is a soft rock song that speaks of a love that never dies. Music critics made note of "Until It Beats No More" being an ode to Lopez's then-husband Marc Anthony. The song received universal acclaim from music critics, who cited it as a stand-out track on Love?. Upon the release of Love?, the song debuted at number nine on the South Korea Gaon International Chart.

"Until It Beats No More" has been performed live on numerous occasions, most notably at an anniversary concert for the Mohegan Sun casino in Uncasville, Connecticut, where Lopez broke down in tears after the performance. The song was used as background music during Lopez's "My World" commercial for the Fiat 500. The commercial depicts Lopez leaving Manhattan and making her way to hometown of The Bronx, New York. Controversy arose when it was revealed that Lopez had not filmed the commercial in The Bronx, but instead filmed the close-up shots in Los Angeles, while a body double was used for the driving scenes in The Bronx.

== Music and lyrics ==
"Until It Beats No More" (2011)
A twenty-two-second sample of "Until It Beats No More", an ode to Lopez's then-husband Marc Anthony.

"Until It Beats No More" is a soft rock song, with a length of three minutes and fifty-two seconds (3:22). It was written by Evan Bogart, Jörgen Elofsson and Troy "Radio" Johnson, with the latter also producing and audio engineering the track. Kuk Harrell recorded, engineered and edited Lopez's vocals for the song at Pulse Recording in Los Angeles, California, with additional editing from Chris "Tek" O'Ryan. The song was later mixed by Trevor Muzzy.

"Until It Beats No More" speaks of a love that never dies. According to Lopez, it is about when you are at a bad point in your life and somebody comes in and makes you believe in love again. She cited her then-husband Marc Anthony as being that person for her. Monica Herrera of Billboard picked up on this, with the lyrics: "I feel the beat again, stronger than before". Scott Shetler of PopCrush pointed out the song's optimistic viewpoint, with the lyrics: "I'm alive, I can breathe, I can feel, I believe."

The song received a positive review from Monica Herrera of Billboard, who called the song "honest and adult". Jody Rosen of Rolling Stone cited "Until It Beats No More" as being one of two stand-outs songs on Love?; the other being "On the Floor". Shane Phoenix of Hot Spots gave a positive review of the song, stating that the lyrics are "spot on" and the "winds are fabo, the keys and key breaks in this one really allow her vocal sense to come out and shine". He concluded by stating that: "If you have been looking for a new love song, this could be your pick".

== Live performances ==
Lopez debuted "Until It Beats No More" live on February 27, 2010, during her hosting gig on Saturday Night Live. Lopez introduced the song as "Pieces". She performed the song on October 22, 2011, at an anniversary concert for the Mohegan Sun casino in Uncasville, Connecticut. Lopez introduced the song by saying: "I'm going to sing you the last song I wrote about love... a lot has changed since then." Following the performance of the song, Lopez began crying.

"Until It Beats No More" was used as an introduction to Lopez's performance at the American Music Awards on November 20, 2011. She wore a golden gown, with the words: "Love... It's a journey and I still have questions" appearing in a screen behind her. Lopez began to break down, appearing as though she was about to cry. She then paused, looked up and shed most of her clothes for a performance of "Papi". Critics noted the "fake breakdown" to be poking fun at her breakdown during her performance of the song at the Mohegan Sun casino a month earlier. The performance was compared to Britney Spears's music video for "Toxic" and Lopez's performance during the 2001 American Music Awards.

"Until It Beats No More" was included on the set list of Lopez's debut concert tour, the Dance Again World Tour, in 2012. Reviewing her concert in Dubai, Natalie Long of Tabloid! said that although a large portion of her performance was uptempo, "When she did take a seat to sing, giving her full voice to songs like 'Until It Beats No More', she proved she was the perfect American Idol judge – she’s got great pipes. What can’t this woman do?"

== Usage in media ==
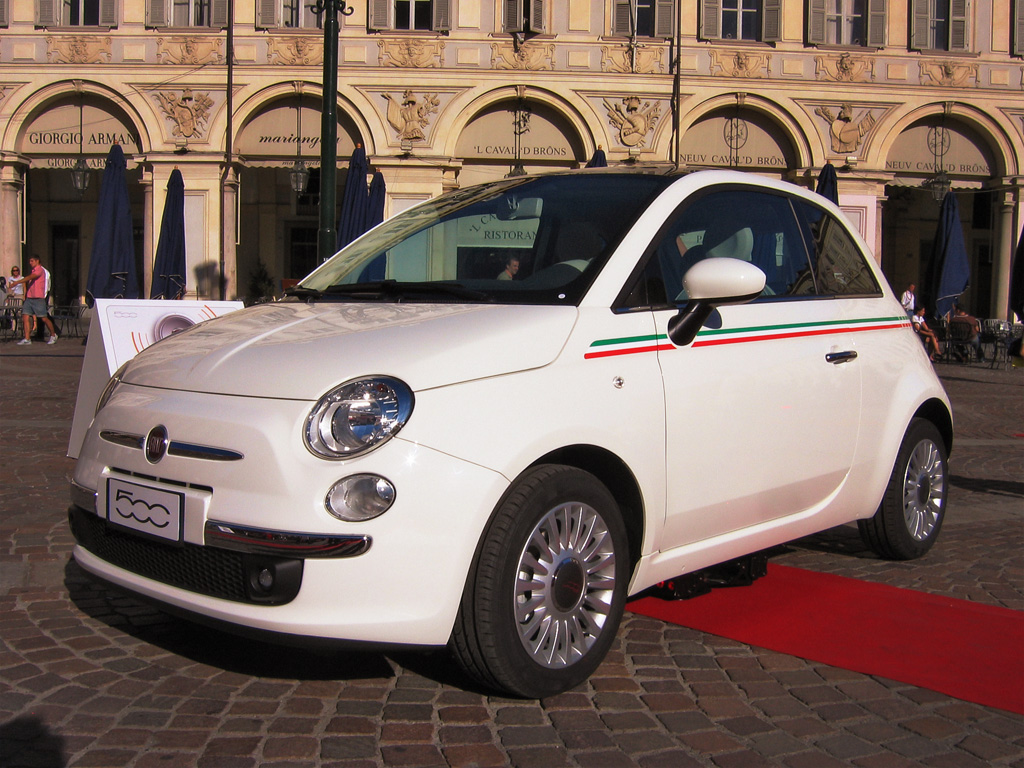
"Until It Beats No More" was used as background music during Lopez's commercial for the Fiat 500

"Until It Beats No More" is featured as background music in Lopez's commercial for the Fiat 500. The commercial, entitled "My World", depicts Lopez leaving Manhattan and making her way to The Bronx, her hometown. Lopez is seen behind the steering wheel of the car, gazing out at the scenery of The Bronx passing by. A voice-over says the words: "Here, this is my world. This place inspires me to be tougher, to stay sharper, to think faster. They may be just streets to you but to me, they're a playground."

Controversy arose for the commercial when it was reported that Lopez did not return to The Bronx to shoot the commercial. Instead, Lopez filmed her close-up shots in Los Angeles, while a body double was used for the car scenes through The Bronx. Fiat and Lopez were slammed for false advertising Lopez's return to The Bronx. Fiat released a statement stating: "Both commercials featuring Jennifer Lopez were indeed filmed in the Bronx as well as outside locations. As you may know, in today's world, people are increasingly mobile and their work takes them to a variety of locations. As a result, we took the opportunity to film wherever Ms. Lopez was working at the time to accommodate her schedule. The commercial tells the story of how the simple elements of our upbringing can help explain who we are, where we're going and serve as a source of inspiration to achieve our goals in life. One does not need to be in a specific location to be inspired or continue to be inspired."

== Credits and personnel ==
Credits adapted from the liner notes of Love?.

- Jennifer Lopez – lead vocals
- Jim Annunziato – vocal engineer
- Evan Bogart – songwriter
- Jörgen Elofsson – songwriter
- Shani Gonzales – additional A&R
- Josh Gudwin – vocal engineer
- Kuk Harrell – vocal producer, vocal engineer, vocal editor
- Troy "Radio" Johnson – songwriter, producer, audio engineer
- Trevor Muzzy – mixing engineer
- Chris "Tek" O'Ryan – vocal editor

== Charts ==
Chart (2011)	Peak position
South Korea (Gaon International Digital Chart)	17
