= Ras Baalbek =

Ras Baalbek رأس بعلبك
- Village
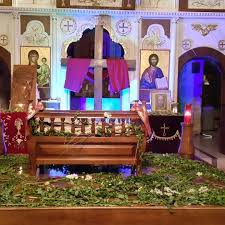
- Our Lady of Ras Baalbek Convent

- Location in Lebanon
- Coordinates: 34°15′35″N 36°25′25″E
- Country: Lebanon
- Governorate: Baalbek-Hermel
- District: Baalbek
- Elevation: 3,300 ft (1,000 m)

Population (2015)
  - Total: 6,000

Ras Baalbek (Arabic: رأس بعلبك) is a village in the northern Beqaa Valley in Lebanon.

== History ==
Ras Baalbek is 500 metres west of a Neolithic rock shelter called Ras Baalbek I.

To the east there are ruins that are alleged to be the remains of a Roman aqueduct. Inhabitants of the village have confirmed it was once called "Connaya," suggesting a link to the ancient settlement of Conna, mentioned in the work of Antonius. Notable features include the monastery of "Our Lady of Ras Baalbek" (Deir Saidat ar-Ras) and two Byzantine churches. One church is in the centre of the village and the other lies by the Roman aqueduct.

In 1838, Eli Smith noted Ras Baalbek's population as being predominantly Catholic Christian.

== Demographics ==
Around 6,000 people live in Ras Baalbek. The population is entirely Christian, mainly Greek Catholic, having switched from Greek Orthodoxy in 1721.

== Bibliography ==
- Robinson, E.; Smith, E. (1841). Biblical Researches in Palestine, Mount Sinai and Arabia Petraea: A Journal of Travels in the year 1838. Vol. 3. Boston: Crocker & Brewster.
