= Rebirth (Jennifer Lopez album) =

Studio album by Jennifer Lopez
- Released: March 1, 2005
- Recorded: 2004–2005
- Studios: Cove City Sound Studios (Glen Cove); Night Flight Studios (Fort Washington); Pie Studios (Glen Cove); The Poolhouse (Long Island); The Poolhouse West (Encino); The Record Plant (Los Angeles); Sony Music Studios (New York City); 2nd Floor Recording (Orlando)
- Genres: Dance; hip hop; R&B
- Length: 48:13
- Label: Epic
- Producers: Robert Anthony; Marc Anthony; Big Boi; Tim & Bob; Gregory Bruno; Cutmaster Swiff; Danja; Hector Diaz; Rich Harrison; Rodney "Darkchild" Jerkins; Fred "Uncle Freddie" Jerkins III; Jennifer Lopez; Nyce Boy; Cory Rooney; Timbaland

Jennifer Lopez chronology
The Reel Me (2003)	Rebirth (2005)	Como Ama una Mujer (2007)

Singles from Rebirth
- 1. "Get Right" Released: January 4, 2005; 2. "Hold You Down" Released: February 15, 2005

Rebirth is the fourth studio album by American singer Jennifer Lopez. It was released on March 1, 2005, by Epic Records. Following the release of her third studio album This Is Me... Then (2002), which was dedicated to her fiancé at the time Ben Affleck, Lopez decided to focus on her film career. After her engagement to Affleck ended, Lopez put her career on hiatus, as she felt that it had been on a "roller-coaster" ride for years. She soon married fellow Hispanic recording artist Marc Anthony, and professed that she had entered "phase two" of her life, signifying a new beginning.

In late 2004, Lopez began working on Rebirth with producers such as Cory Rooney, Tim & Bob, Timbaland, Rodney Jerkins and Anthony. She explained the album's concept as her being reborn following the media circus that followed her romance with Affleck. Having taken a vacation, Lopez returned feeling rejuvenated. Additionally, she aimed to be rid of the "J.Lo" persona, which she described as not being a "real person", confusing the public. However, she later stated that this was blown out of proportion. Rebirth was milder than her previous material, consisting of mainly mid-tempo R&B songs. It also included dance, funk, and hip hop genres.

Rebirth received generally mixed reviews. While some praised its uptempo material, other critics were unfavorable of its mild content and Lopez's vocals. The album experienced moderate success. In the United States, it peaked at number two on the Billboard 200, and was certified platinum by the Recording Industry Association of America for shipments of one million copies. Globally, it reached the top ten in most major music markets. The album spawned two singles. The first, "Get Right", peaked atop the UK Singles Chart and reached number 12 in the United States, while Rebirth's second single "Hold You Down" failed to make an impact, charting moderately.

== Background ==
In November 2002, Lopez became engaged to actor and director Ben Affleck. Their high-profiled relationship garnered a substantial amount of media attention. The public and media began to refer to them as "Bennifer" and they became a prominent supercouple in the media and popular culture. That November, she released her third studio album entitled This Is Me... Then. The album was dedicated to Affleck, who was her "muse" for the record's lyrics. The album performed strongly, opening to her highest first-week sales and becoming one of the best-selling albums of her career. However, overexposure from the media and public interest in their relationship resulted in less admiration for their work and negatively affected their careers. The couple broke off their engagement and split up by January 2004. Following this, she decided to take a break from her career, and married Marc Anthony months later. Following this, Lopez became more private, stating: "I don't want to talk about anything that is personal or private at all, because what's the use? You're open with people, and then they try and make a soap opera out of your life."

In October 2004, it was reported that Lopez was in the studio working with Sean Garrett on material for her first album in two years. That December, it was announced that the album would be titled Rebirth. MTV News confirmed that artists such as Fat Joe, Fabolous and Anthony would appear on the album, and revealed multiple song titles including "Step Into My World", "Cherry Pie" and "Still Around".

== Title ==
"I decided to call it Rebirth because I had taken a vacation for the first time in a long time. I'm a bit of a workaholic, and when I came back it felt I was in a different phase of my career, as well as life, and the title represents a new beginning."

— Lopez on the album's title.

Rebirth is dedicated to Paige Peterson, an eleven-year-old cancer patient whom Lopez befriended during visits to the Children's Hospital Los Angeles. Peterson died in November 2004. The album's title is personal to Lopez, as she felt reborn and wanted to be rid of the "J-Lo" diva persona the public believed her to be. According to Digital Spy, Lopez stated, "I'm not J.Lo, she's not a real person. She was just a bit of fun that got really crazy. I've never been anyone but Jennifer." She considered naming the album Call Me Jennifer, as that would be her "way of saying goodbye to the whole J.Lo thing". This led to confusion with the public as to whether Lopez had dropped her moniker, with Lopez admitting that her comments were blown out of proportion. She later stated, "You can call me J-Lo or you could call me Jennifer or you could call me Jenny - I don't care!" Having recorded the album after a six-month hiatus, Lopez felt that she was "back where she started". Explaining that she was "on such a roller-coaster ride" from her first album to This Is Me... Then, she stated, "[when] I came back, this was the first project I did. I felt like it was a new beginning for me, like I was, in a way, reborn. I was where I was when I made my first album."

== Composition ==
"Step Into My World"
A twenty-six second sample of "Step Into My World". Containing a flute sample, the song is influenced by African music and contains breathy vocals. In the song, Lopez urges her lover to step into her desirable world.

"He'll Be Back"
A twenty-six second sample of "He'll Be Back". A break-up song produced by Timbaland, which was speculated to be about Lopez's ex Ben Affleck.

Rebirth predominantly consists of dance and hip hop music, while also incorporating '80s pop-rock. Lopez was influenced by James Brown's music when creating Rebirth. The album opens with the song "Get Right", an R&B, dance-pop and funk-influenced song written by Rich Harrison, which contains heavy horn instrumentation. The song was originally recorded by Usher with the title "Ride" for his album Confessions, but was scrapped. "Step Into My World" contains African music influences, and is sung by Lopez through a breathy vocal.

"Hold You Down" is a "mellow" R&B song which features Fat Joe. It samples Shirley Murdock's "As We Lay". The track was a "last minute" add to Rebirth. Lopez recruited Fat Joe for the song because it was a "friendship record", and she didn't want to do it with anybody else. He said, "We don't talk every day, but we got mad love for each other whenever we see each other. It's always crazy love." "Whatever You Wanna Do", also written and produced by Harrison, makes use of drums and horn instrumentals. "Cherry Pie" is an uptempo pop-rock song which features drums and an electric guitar; Lopez describes the song as having a "Prince vibe". "I Got U", written and produced by Jerkins, lyrically speaks about her secretive relationship with Anthony, with lyrics such as "Sometimes real love can be not seen 'cause you're thinking what's right in front of you can't be the one for you."

"Still Around" is a summer-influenced R&B song which lyrically speaks about undying love. Anthony makes a spoken appearance in the track. "Ryde or Die" is an intense R&B and hip hop track which was co-written by singer Brandy for 2004 album Afrodisiac. The song was later given to Lopez who recorded it. "I, Love" is a mid-tempo song which contains staccato percussion and airy synths. The song's lyrics have Lopez convincing her lover that she cares about him, and that their chemistry isn't "pretend" or "make-believe", with her even stating that she'd die before hurting him. "He'll Be Back" and "(Can't Believe) This Is Me", the album's final tracks, have been said to address lingering issues in Lopez's own love life. "He'll Be Back", produced by Timbaland, has been viewed as a "dis song" to Ben Affleck, in which Lopez sings, "I know better than anybody how it feels to want somebody so bad after you breakup." "(Can't Believe) This Is Me" is a power ballad produced by Anthony, which references "every link in J.Lo's long relationship chain".

== Release and promotion ==
During the album's December 2004 release party in Stockholm, Sweden, Lopez and Anthony abruptly left the event because of reportedly disruptive loud men who were under the influence of alcohol. That month, Lopez also traveled to the United Kingdom to promote Rebirth, being interviewed by radio stations such as Capital FM. In the United Kingdom and the United States, it was released by Epic Records on March 1, 2005. It was also released by Sony Entertainment in most other regions, including Australia. On January 4, 2005, Lopez engaged in a live chat on MSN.com with her fans, in which she answered questions about Rebirth and its conception. On the day of the album's release, Lopez appeared at the Virgin Megastore in Times Square, New York City, where she signed copies of the CD. On March 3, she appeared at Hot 97's Full Frontal Hip Hop concert.

Lopez was slated to embark on a short promotional tour of European cities as well as Dubai, but cancelled it. She later put out a statement saying that she was ill: "I very much wanted to be in London today but unfortunately I'm not well. At the advice of my doctors I'm unable to travel. Being sick has also caused me to cancel my European album tour." Lopez had expressed her hopes to embark on a world tour to support Rebirth. She told MTV News: "I've tried to plan a tour so many times. And we're planning it again. It's exciting." Lopez explained that her film career made it hard for her to tour, "It's been hard to map out that amount of time to really do it right." However, details for a tour were never unveiled and it subsequently did not occur.

Rebirth produced just two singles. "Get Right" was released on January 3, 2005. America Online broadcast the music video the previous day, while MTV screened the video's creation on Making the Video on January 5. The following day, the full music video aired on Total Request Live, BET and FUSE. In the music video directed by Francis Lawrence, Lopez plays a number of different characters in a nightclub, "examining all the little moments that happen almost simultaneously in a nightclub during the duration of a single song". "Get Right" charted at number 12 on the US Billboard Hot 100 and peaked at number one on the UK Singles Chart. "Hold You Down" featuring Fat Joe was released as the album's second and final single. It peaked at number 64 on the Billboard Hot 100. The song being released as a single was criticized, with PopMatters describing it as an "ill-fated, milquetoast duet".

== Critical reception ==
Professional ratings
Aggregate scores
Source	Rating
Metacritic	52/100
Review scores
Source	Rating
AllMusic	4/5 stars
The A.V. Club	(mixed)
Entertainment Weekly	C
The Guardian	3/5 stars
Los Angeles Times	(mixed)
PopMatters	4/10 stars
Rolling Stone	2/5 stars
Slant	2.5/5 stars
Uncut	3.5/5 stars
Yahoo! Music UK	7/10 stars

Rebirth generally received mixed reviews from the music critics, At Metacritic, which assigns a normalized rating out of 100 to reviews from music critics, the album received an average score of 52, which indicates "mixed or average reviews", based on nine reviews. AllMusic's Stephen Thomas Erlewine praised Rebirth as a "straight-ahead dance album, alternating between sweet, breezy pop tunes" and stated that whilst Lopez was not a "flashy singer", she was appealing on the record due to the fact that she was able to present her limitations in "tuneful packages with big, exciting beats". Rob Sheffield of Rolling Stone was unfavorable of the album, calling Lopez a "rinky-dink pop singer". Yahoo! Music's Dan Gennoe spoke positively of the album in comparison to the singer's previous works, stating that Lopez has "finally turned the autopilot off and decided to take her pop career seriously. The album’s called Rebirth for a reason." Nathan Rabin of The A.V. Club described Lopez's vocals as "heavily processed", giving the album a mixed review whilst opining that the album's first half "packs a certain fizzy effervescence, but the album sags as it approaches the finishing line." Entertainment Weekly's David Browne described Rebirth as "mild" and was unfavorable, stating that Lopez "wants her music to be inoffensive and as easy to swallow as baby food" so that it could appeal to a wide consumer base.

Alexis Petridis of The Guardian gave the album a mixed review, concluding, "Despite the highlights, you're still left pondering the question: what happened to Jennifer Lopez?" Today Music's Tracy Hopkins observed, "Rebirth is a satisfying listen, but fans who like their Jenny from the block hot and spicy will be slightly disappointed by the disc’s milder dance-pop flavor." Slant Magazine's Sal Cinquemani wrote in summation that the album "kind of is like a rebirth, but it's mostly just another Jennifer Lopez record: a few good songs, some badly sung filler, great production, and a whole team of collaborators to make it all work". Mike Schiller of PopMatters argued that Rebirth is "anything but the renaissance that its title promises", calling it a "slight shift in style" for Lopez which features "the occasional surprise" and is "totally harmless".

== Commercial performance ==
=== North America ===
In the United States, Rebirth performed moderately. It debuted at number two on the US Billboard 200 with first-week sales of 261,000 copies. This was below This Is Me... Then, which sold 314,000 copies in its opening week. The following week, the album dropped to number four, with sales of 87,000 copies. During its third week on the chart, Rebirth fell to number seven, selling 60,000 copies, bringing its total after three weeks to 408,000. It slipped to number twenty in the following weeks with sales of 27,000 copies. On April 14, 2005, Rebirth was certified platinum by the Recording Industry Association of America (RIAA) for shipments of over one million copies. By June 2005, the album had fallen out of the chart's top 100. As of July 24, 2020 the album has sold 746,000 copies in the US, according to Nielsen Music/MRC Data.

Rebirth entered the Canadian Albums Chart at number two, selling 19,700 copies. It was eventually certified platinum by Music Canada, marking shipments of 100,000 copies. It reached number eight on the UK Albums Chart, selling 41,000 copies during its first week. It had sold over 124,000 copies by the year's end, and was certified gold.

=== Elsewhere ===
Globally, the album topped the charts in Switzerland and the Netherlands, as well as the European album chart, and reached the top ten in Argentina, Australia, Austria, Belgium, France, Germany, Greece, Hungary, Italy and Taiwan, top twenty in Denmark, Finland, Mexico and Portugal and top thirty in New Zealand and Norway.

== Track listing ==
No.	Title	Writer(s)	Producer(s)	Length
1.	"Get Right"	Rich Harrison; Usher Raymond; James Brown	Harrison; Cory Rooney	3:45
2.	"Step Into My World"	Rodney "Darkchild" Jerkins; Delisha Thomas; Fred "Uncle Freddie" Jerkins III; Hector Diaz	Jerkins; Jerkins III; Diaz; Rooney^{[a]}	4:05
3.	"Hold You Down" (featuring Fat Joe)	Gregory Christopher; Gregory Bruno; Makeba Riddick; Joe Cartagena; Rooney; Larry Troutman; Billy Beck	Nyce Boy; Bruno; Rooney	4:32
4.	"Whatever You Wanna Do"	Harrison; Delma Churchill; Harvey Fuqua; Kenneth Hawkins	Harrison; Rooney	3:49
5.	"Cherry Pie"	Jennifer Lopez; Tim Kelley; Bob Robinson; Rooney	Tim & Bob; Rooney	4:06
6.	"I Got U"	Jerkins; Jerkins III; Thomas; LaShawn Daniels; Aaron Pearce	Jerkins; Rooney^{[a]}	3:57
7.	"Still Around"	Antwan Patton; Archie Hall; Rooney	Big Boi; Cutmaster Swiff; Rooney	3:22
8.	"Ryde or Die"	Robert "Big Bert" Smith; Blake English; Brandy Norwood	Robert Anthony; Rooney	4:03
9.	"I, Love"	Kelley; Robinson; Rooney	Tim & Bob; Rooney	3:42
10.	"He'll Be Back"	Walter Millsap III; Candice Nelson; Timothy Mosley	Timbaland; Danja^{[b]}; Rooney^{[a]}	4:18
11.	"(Can't Believe) This Is Me"	Lopez; Marc Anthony; Rooney	M. Anthony	4:44
12.	"Get Right" (featuring Fabolous)	Harrison; Raymond; John Jackson; Brown	Harrison; Rooney	3:50
Total length:				48:13

Japanese bonus track
No.	Title	Writer(s)	Producer(s)	Length
13.	"Get Right" (Instrumental)	Harrison; Raymond; Brown	Harrison; Rooney	3:45
Total length:				51:58

Limited edition DVD and DualDisc DVD side bonus features
No.	Title	Length
1.	"Rebirth Documentary"	6:29
2.	"Get Right" (video)	5:13
3.	"Get Right" (featuring Fabolous) (video)	3:58
Total length:		15:40

Notes

- ^{^a} signifies a vocal producer
- ^{^b} signifies a co-producer
- "Get Right" contains elements of "Soul Power '74", written by James Brown, as performed by Maceo & the Macks.
- "Hold You Down" contains elements of "As We Lay", written by Larry Troutman and Billy Beck, as performed by Shirley Murdock.
- "Whatever You Wanna Do" contains elements of "Con-Funk-Shun", written by Delma Churchill, Harvey Fuqua and Kenneth Hawkins, as performed by The Nite-Liters.

== Personnel ==
Credits adapted from the album booklet for Rebirth.

Production

- Mert Alaş – photography
- Jim Annunziato – assistant engineer
- Marc Anthony – producer
- Robert Anthony – producer
- Chris Avedon – engineer
- Scotty Beats – engineer
- Big Boi – producer
- Gregory Bruno – producer
- Cutmaster Swift – producer
- Danja – producer
- Hector Diaz – programming, producer
- Dylan Ely – assistant engineer
- Mauricio Gasca – arranger, programing, recording engineer
- Mike Evans – production coordination
- Katie Grand – stylist
- Rich Harrison – programming, producer
- Fred "Uncle Freddie" Jerkins III – producer
- Rodney Jerkins – programming, producer

- Tim Kelley – drum programming – producer
- Peter Wade Keusch – engineer, mixing
- Jennifer Lopez – executive producer
- Andrew McKay – production coordination
- Nyce Boy – producer
- Oribe – hair stylist
- Julian Peploe – art direction
- William E. Pettaway Jr. – production coordination
- Marcus Piggott – photography
- Herb Powers – mastering
- Geneva Randolph – production coordination
- Cory Rooney – producer, executive producer, vocal producer
- Bruce Swedien – engineer, mixing
- Delisha Thomas – vocal arrangement
- Charlotte Tilbury – make-up
- Timbaland – producer
- Mike Tschupp – assistant engineer

Performance credits

- Jennifer Lopez – vocals
- Marco Britti – drums
- Mario Guini – guitar
- Bob Robinson – electric guitar
- Erben Perez – bass
- Cory Rooney – keyboards
- Tim Kelley – bass, keyboards
- Delisha Thomas – background vocals
- Andrea Mendez – background vocals
- Candice Nelson – background vocals
- Makeba Riddick – background vocals
- Rudaina Haddad – background vocals

== Chart positions ==
=== Weekly charts ===
Chart (2005)	Peak position
Argentine Albums (CAPIF)	2
Australian Albums (ARIA)	10
Australian Urban Albums (ARIA)	2
Austrian Albums (Ö3 Austria)	5
Belgian Albums (Ultratop Flanders)	4
Belgian Albums (Ultratop Wallonia)	4
Canadian Albums (Billboard)	2
Czech Albums (ČNS IFPI)	29
Danish Albums (Hitlisten)	15
Dutch Albums (Album Top 100)	1
European Albums (Billboard)	1
Finnish Albums (Suomen virallinen lista)	19
French Albums (SNEP)	7
German Albums (Offizielle Top 100)	3
Greek Albums (IFPI)	6
Hungarian Albums (MAHASZ)	3
Irish Albums (IRMA)	9
Italian Albums (FIMI)	3
Japanese Albums (Oricon)	3
Mexican Albums (AMPROFON)	19
New Zealand Albums (RMNZ)	22
Norwegian Albums (VG-lista)	25
Polish Albums (ZPAV)	8
Portuguese Albums (AFP)	11
Scottish Albums (Official Charts)	17
Singaporean Albums (RIAS)	6
South Korean Albums (RIAK)	8
Spanish Albums (Promusicae)	2
Swedish Albums (Sverigetopplistan)	14
Swiss Albums (Schweizer Hitparade)	1
Taiwanese Albums (Five Music)	1
UK Albums (Official Charts)	8
UK R&B Albums (Official Charts)	1
US Billboard 200	2
US Top R&B/Hip-Hop Albums (Billboard)	2

=== Year-end charts ===
Chart (2005)	Peak position
Australian Urban Albums (ARIA)	24
Belgian Albums (Ultratop Flanders)	69
Belgian Albums (Ultratop Wallonia)	58
Dutch Albums (Dutch Charts)	68
French Albums (SNEP)	128
German Albums (Offizielle Deutsche Charts)	96
Hungarian Albums (MAHASZ)	96
Italian Albums (FIMI)	76
Japanese Albums (Oricon)	61
Mexican Albums Chart (AMPROFON)	82
Swiss Albums (Schweizer Hitparade)	61
UK Albums (OCC)	155
US Billboard 200 (Billboard)	95
US Top R&B/Hip-Hop Albums (Billboard)	58
Worldwide Albums (IFPI)	40

== Certifications and sales ==
Region	Certification	Certified units/sales
Australia (ARIA)	Gold	35,000^{^}
Canada (Music Canada)	Platinum	100,000^{^}
France (SNEP)	Gold	100,000^{*}
Hungary (MAHASZ)	Gold	5,000^{^}
Ireland (IRMA)	Gold	7,500^{^}
Japan (RIAJ)	Gold	244,689
South Korea	—	5,968
Switzerland (IFPI Switzerland)	Gold	20,000^{^}
United Kingdom (BPI)	Gold	100,000^{^}
United States (RIAA)	Platinum	1,000,000^{^}
^{*} Sales figures based on certification alone.^{^} Shipments figures based on certification alone.
