= Get It Poppin' (Fat Joe song) =

Single by Fat Joe featuring Nelly

from the album All or Nothing
- Released: May 24, 2005
- Recorded: 2005
- Studio: Jerusalem Studios (Miami, FL)
- Genre: Hip hop
- Length: 3:32
- Label: Terror Squad; Atlantic
- Songwriters: Joseph Cartagena; Scott Storch
- Producer: Scott Storch

Fat Joe singles chronology
"So Much More" (2005)	"Get It Poppin'" (2005)	"I Don't Care" (2005)

Nelly singles chronology
"Fly Away" (2005)	"Get It Poppin'" (2005)	"Grillz" (2005)

Music video
- "Get It Poppin'" on YouTube

"Get It Poppin'" is a song performed by American rappers Fat Joe and Nelly. It was released on May 24, 2005 through Terror Squad/Atlantic Records as the second single from the former's sixth solo studio album All or Nothing. Recorded at Jerusalem Studios in Miami, it was produced by Scott Storch.

The song debuted at number 88 and managed to reach number nine on the Billboard Hot 100 chart in the United States. On October 25, 2005, the single was certified gold by the Recording Industry Association of America for sales of over a 500,000 copies in the US alone.

== Chart performance ==
In the United States, the song peaked at number 9 on the Billboard Hot 100, becoming Fat Joe's second top-ten recording on the chart behind "What's Luv?". It also made it to number 7 on both the Radio Songs and Pop Airplay, number 17 on the Hot R&B/Hip-Hop Songs and number 6 on the Hot Rap Songs charts.

In the United Kingdom, the song reached number 34 on the UK singles chart and number 8 on the Official Hip Hop and R&B Singles Chart. It peaked at number 26 on the Irish singles chart as well.

The single found some success in Europe, peaking at number 9 in Finland, number 48 in Germany, number 49 in Switzerland and number 50 in Austria.

The single also peaked at number 30 in Australia (as well as number 15 on the Australian Urban chart) and number 24 in New Zealand.

== Music video ==
An accompanying music video, directed by Chris Robinson, was set in Atlanta, starring Fat Joe and Nelly with cameo appearances from T.I., Ying Yang Twins, Boyz n da Hood and Layzie Bone.

== Track listing ==
No.	Title	Writer(s)	Producer(s)	Length
1.	"Get It Poppin'" (featuring Nelly)	Joseph Cartagena; Scott Storch	Scott Storch	3:32
2.	"Here's a Little Story"	Cartagena; Marcello Valenzano; Andre Lyon; Adam Horovitz; Darryl McDaniels; Rick Rubin; Joseph Simmons	Cool & Dre	4:25
Total length:				7:57

== Personnel ==
- Joseph "Fat Joe" Cartagena – vocals, executive producer
- Cornell "Nelly" Haynes Jr. – vocals
- Jackie Rubio – additional vocals
- Scott Storch – producer
- Robert "Big Brizz" Brisbane – recording
- Serban Ghenea – mixing
- John Hanes – additional Pro Tools engineering
- Tim Roberts – additional Pro Tools engineering assistant
- Chris Gehringer – mastering
- Marcello "Cool" Valenzano – executive producer
- Andre "Dre" Lyon – executive producer
- Khaled Khaled – executive producer
- Rob "Reef" Tewlow – A&R

== Charts ==
=== Weekly charts ===
Charts (2005)	Peak position
Australia (ARIA)	30
Australian Urban (ARIA)	15
Austria (Ö3 Austria Top 40)	50
Canada CHR/Pop Top 30 (Radio & Records)	11
Finland (Suomen virallinen lista)	9
Germany (GfK)	48
Ireland (IRMA)	26
New Zealand (Recorded Music NZ)	24
Switzerland (Schweizer Hitparade)	49
UK Singles (Official Charts)	34
UK Hip Hop/R&B (Official Charts)	8
US Billboard Hot 100	9
US Radio Songs (Billboard)	7
US Hot R&B/Hip-Hop Songs (Billboard)	17
US Pop Airplay (Billboard)	7
US R&B/Hip-Hop Airplay (Billboard)	19
US Hot Rap Songs (Billboard)	6

=== Year-end charts ===
Chart (2005)	Position
US Billboard 100	50
US Hot R&B/Hip-Hop Songs (Billboard)	98

== Certifications ==
Region	Certification	Certified units/sales
United States (RIAA)	Gold	500,000^{^}
^{^} Shipments figures based on certification alone.

== Release history ==
Release dates and formats for "Get It Poppin'"
Region	Date	Format	Label(s)	Ref.
United States	May 31, 2005	Mainstream airplay	Atlantic	
