= Get Right =

2005 single by Jennifer Lopez

Single by Jennifer Lopez

from the album Rebirth
- B-side: "Feelin' So Good"; "Hold You Down"
- Released: January 3, 2005
- Recorded: 2004
- Studio: Night Flight (Fort Washington, Maryland); The Poolhouse (Long Island, New York)
- Genre: Dance; R&B
- Length: 3:45
- Label: Epic
- Songwriters: Rich Harrison; James Brown; Usher Raymond
- Producers: Rich Harrison; Cory Rooney

Jennifer Lopez singles chronology
| "Baby I Love U!" (2003) | "Get Right" (2005) | "Hold You Down" (2005) |

Music video
- "Get Right" on YouTube

"Get Right" is a song by American singer Jennifer Lopez for her fourth studio album, Rebirth (2005). It was written by Rich Harrison and James Brown, and produced by Harrison and Cory Rooney. An upbeat dance and R&B song with jazz and funk influences, "Get Right" marks a departure in Lopez's musical style, and has been called one of her most "memorable" songs by The New York Times. It is built around a sample of "Soul Power 74" by Maceo and the Macks, and was noted for its heavy use of saxophone and horn instrumentation. The song contains lyrics about dancing, sex and drinking at a club. American rapper Fabolous is featured on a separate version of the song which is present as a bonus track on Rebirth.

"Get Right" was announced as the album's lead single in November 2004, and it was released on January 3, 2005. Music critics generally commended the song's production, but felt that Lopez's "talk-singing" vocals were lackluster. It peaked at number 12 on the Billboard Hot 100 and was certified Gold by the Recording Industry Association of America. Outside of the United States, "Get Right" topped the charts of Ireland, Italy, and the United Kingdom, and peaked within the top 10 in of the charts in other international music markets, including Australia, Denmark, Germany, and Spain.

A music video for "Get Right" directed by Francis Lawrence—who previously directed her "Waiting for Tonight" music video—was released on the day of the song's release. It featured Lopez playing eight different characters attending a nightclub; their short sub-storylines would all develop in the song's duration. The clip became a widespread success, becoming one of MTV's most played music videos internationally at one stage. It also received heavy airplay in the United States, and received four MTV Video Music Award nominations. Lopez has performed "Get Right" live on multiple occasions, most notably in the Super Bowl LIV halftime show.

== Background ==
Following the release of her third studio album, This Is Me... Then (2002), and the media circus caused following the demise of her two-year relationship with American actor-director Ben Affleck, Lopez took a break from her career. During her time off, she wed long-time friend Marc Anthony. Once she felt like it was time to make her return, she began recording material for her fourth studio album, Rebirth (2005). Lopez told Billboard that taking time off was hard for her to do, as it was, in her own words, "not really in my genes—it's not part of my make-up. There were times when my life was like a roller coaster ride, but as an artist, you need time to clarify. I've grown a lot since my first album. Vocally, I've become more confident. I record songs with a different attack—with a different vigor".

== Writing and production ==
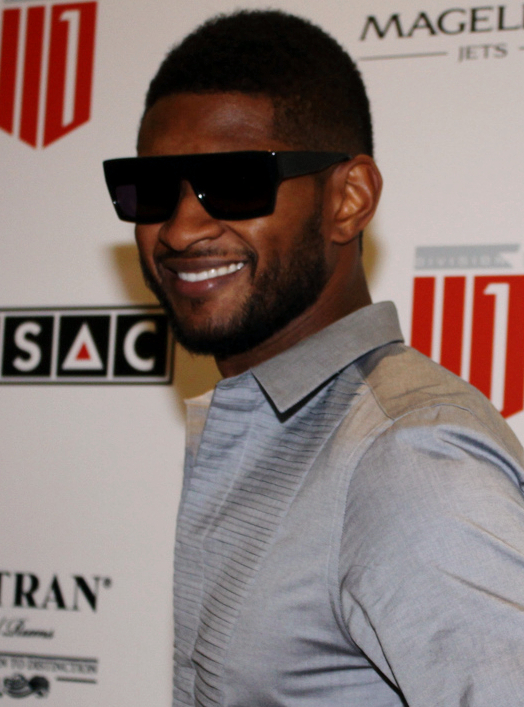
Usher recorded "Ride" with Rich Harrison. Harrison later gave it to Lopez as "Get Right" without his consent.

While recording his fourth studio album, Confessions (2004), American recording artist Usher collaborated with record producer Rich Harrison; only one of the songs they did together, "Take Your Hand", made the album's final track listing. However, one of the songs that missed the album's track listing was "Ride", composed by Harrison, although it was made available as a 12-inch club record and as a leaked internet download. Harrison decided to rework the song for Lopez after opting to give "1 Thing" to Amerie over her. The resulting "Get Right" contained the "same horn track" and "same vocal guidelines" as "Ride". Sources reported that Usher was unhappy and wanted publishing credits, because he "couldn't get it right" for Confessions, but didn't expect it to be used by someone else; "I'd better get some of the publishing rights or else," he was allegedly quoted saying.

According to MTV News, most of Usher's lyrics to "Ride" differ from Lopez's "Get Right". In one verse, he sings: "It's the way that you look at me, piques my curiosity". "I'm wondering what you're feeling tonight/ We never chilled, we never spent no time/ So let's take a minute/ ... Show you what I'm feeling inside/ Baby, hold on, tonight we're gonna ride." As "Ride" had been circulating online for months, following the release of "Get Right", club DJs began playing the songs back-to-back, "letting listeners hear two big-name singers going head-to-head over the same beat".

== Composition ==
"Get Right"
The song's riff comes from a sample of "Soul Power 74".

"Get Right" is an upbeat dance and R&B song with jazz and funk influences, which has a duration of three minutes and forty-five seconds (3:45). It was written by Richard Harrison, who produced it alongside Cory Rooney. Lopez recorded her vocals with Bruce Swedien and Peter Wade Keusch at the Night Flight Studios in Fort Washington and the Poolhouse in Long Island. Swedien and Keusch later mixed her vocals at Cove City Sound Studios, Glen Cove. The song's hook is based around a sample of Maceo and the Macks' track "Soul Power 74". This was a remixed instrumental version of the original James Brown song "Soul Power". A honking saxophone line, described as "wild" by The New York Times, is looped over and over again throughout the song which also utilizes the use of repetitive horn rifts. The song's beat was noted by Milwaukee Journal Sentinel among other sources to be "infectious". Fox News noted the entertainer to be "talk-singing" on the track.

The song's lyrical premise is about Lopez's invitations towards a potential dancer partner, incorporating themes of dance, sex and alcohol. She promises him that "before the night is up we can get right" during the song's chorus. She later states "I'm about to fill your cup/So we can get it right". In the bridge of "Get Right", the lyrics are identical to Usher's "Ride". Lopez sings, "So much we've got to say, but so little time/ And if tonight ain't long enough, don't leave love behind/ (Don't leave this man behind)/ Baby, take my hand". On the song's remix, American rapper Fabolous is featured. His lyrics include "I ain't Mr. Right, I'm Mr. Right Now".

== Critical reception ==
The song generally received favourable reviews by the music critics, CBBC Newsound collected public reviews of the song by preteens and teenagers between the ages of 11 and 14. It was described by some as "individual" and "humming tune". "Get Right" was noted for being extremely catchy, with several claiming it "got stuck" in their heads. "It's one of the really rubbish annoying trumpety tunes that get stuck in your head for ages", said one preteen, while another commented, "I really like this song it's one of her good songs and wicked to boogie to at a party". At the Teen Choice Awards, the song was nominated for "Best R&B/Rap Track" as well as "Choice Party Starter".

"[Harrison] turns a couple of notes from Maceo Parker into something both simpler and more chaotic than your average R&B hit. That little saxophone riff is a raucous distraction that refuses to fade into the background".

— Kelefa Sanneh of The New York Times on the song's production

Jack Smith of BBC News called the song "older-than-old-skool brass" while comparing it to Beyoncé's music. Kelefa Sanneh of The New York Times called the song "memorable", crediting the general success of Rebirth during its first week of availability to "one of the year's most unusual R&B songs". Sanneh praised its saxophone line which allowed it to sound "like nothing else on the radio".The Guardian's Alexis Petridis lauded the song, describing it as "brilliant", with "an almost ruthless precision". Mike Schiller of PopMatters noted the single to be "more jazzy and funky than a Jennifer Lopez song has any right to be". Schiller said she kept the song "simple", containing "infectious horns and a simple backbeat" which "manages the feat of being the grooviest dance track Lopez has released since J.Lo's 'Play'." In a mixed review, Commonsensemedia's Kathi Kamen Goldmark said the song, "percolates with manic horn riffs and the kind of infectious energy that makes thin vocals irrelevant." Sal Cinquemani of Slant Magazine agreed, while criticizing her voice, said the "incessant Maceo Parker horn loop of 'Get Right' is obnoxious at best". Although also criticizing Lopez's vocals, Nathan Rabin of The A.V. Club wrote:

"Lopez's exceptionally thin voice hasn't stopped her from cranking out a steady stream of pop hits, which continues with "Get Right," the maddeningly catchy first single from her new Rebirth. More than any of her other smashes, the song illustrates just how irrelevant Lopez's crooning is to her chart success: Producers Rich Harrison and Cory Rooney could easily slip Lopez's whisper of a vocal out of the mix, leaving just funky drumming and furious, staccato horn bursts."

== Chart performance ==
Her first musical release in nearly two years, "Get Right" allowed Lopez to re-enter the media spotlight immediately upon its release. The song debuted at number 53 on the Billboard Hot 100 for the week of January 22, 2005, winning the chart's "Hot Shot Debut of the Week" honor. Two weeks later, "Get Right" had reached the Hot 100's top 40, jumping to number 28. By February 12, 2005, the song had reached a new high of number 13, and for the week ending February 26, 2005, "Get Right" peaked at number 12. This made the song her first lead single that failed to reach the chart's top 10. Additionally, the Louie Vega remix of "Get Right" reached number one on the Billboard Dance Club Play chart and number two on the Billboard Dance Singles Sales chart. The song was certified gold by the Recording Industry Association of America for shipments of 500,000 units.

In Canada, "Get Right" peaked at number three on the Canadian Singles Chart, becoming one of her biggest hits in that country. In the United Kingdom, "Get Right" debuted at the top of the UK Singles Chart on February 20, 2005 – for the week ending date February 26, 2005 – selling 49,928 copies in its first week of release and dethroning U2's "Sometimes You Can't Make It On Your Own" from the top of the chart to become her 12th top-10 hit in Britain, as well as her second number-one song in the country after "Love Don't Cost a Thing" in January 2001. The following week, "Get Right" fell a position to number two when it was dethroned by "Over and Over" by Nelly featuring Tim McGraw.

Elsewhere, the single reached the top 10 of most major music markets, over 18 countries. In Ireland, "Get Right" debuted at the top of the Irish Singles Chart. It experienced similar success in Italy, where it debuted at the top of the Italian Singles Chart, and remained in the top 10 of the chart for 10 weeks. In Belgium, "Get Right" peaked at number two on the Wallonia and number three in Flanders. In France, the song entered on the French Singles Chart at number three on February 13, 2005. The following week, it peaked at number two, while remaining on the chart for 17 weeks, and becoming her highest-charting song on the country until "On The Floor" six years later, who peaked atop. Soon, the Syndicat National de l'Édition Phonographique certified "Get Right" gold for sales of 200,000 copies in France, becoming her seventh single to achieve this there. In New Zealand, the song peaked at number two on the New Zealand Singles Chart, later being certified platinum there for shipments of 15,000. In Australia, "Get Right" peaked at number three on the ARIA Singles Chart, and was certified double platinum by the Australian Recording Industry Association for shipments exceeding 140,000.

== Music video ==
The music video for "Get Right" was shot over the weekend of November 20, 2004. It was directed by Francis Lawrence, who had previously directed the music videos for Lopez's previous singles "Waiting for Tonight" (1999) and "Play" (2001). The clip is "a dance version" of Robert Altman's comedy-drama film Short Cuts (1993). It was reported to examine "all the little moments that happen almost simultaneously in a nightclub during the duration of a single song, in which J. Lo is always the center of the story". A cloned Lopez portrays a DJ, a "diva" Jennifer who is "detached" in a VIP section, as well as patrons on a girl's night out and a bartender among numerous other characters. The entertainer worked with The Talauega Brothers for the music video's choreography. While Lopez was filming the music video, her friend and comedian Ellen DeGeneres made a humorous visit to the clip's set in Los Angeles, California. She danced with Lopez and her dancers, while making a "mess" out of the dance steps. Months later, DeGeneres' visit to the set was aired on The Ellen DeGeneres Show, where Lopez appeared as a featured guest.

On December 31, 2004, Lopez celebrated New Year's Eve by unveiling an exclusive sneak peek look at the music video for "Get Right" on MTV. On January 4, 2005, America Online broadcast the clip, while MTV screened the video's creation on Making the Video the next day. On January 6, the full music video aired on Total Request Live, where Lopez appeared herself, as well as the FUSE networks. The music video was met with popularity. It registered as the most-streamed music video at numerous websites including Yahoo!, MTV.com, MSN, Vh1 and Rolling Stone. On AOL Music's total monthly streams for April 2005, the clip for "Get Right" was viewed over 994,000 times, becoming one of the top 10 most viewed music videos. It also received heavy airplay on television, with cable networks such as Vh1, MTV and BET heavily screening it. Lopez appeared on MTV2's Sucker Free Sunday to promote the clip. For the week of February 19, 2005, the music video for "Get Right" became the number-one clip on MTV internationally. At the 2005 MTV Video Music Awards held on August 28, Lopez received four nominations for "Get Right". This included Best Dance Video, Best Direction in a Video, Best Choreography and Best Editing.

=== Synopsis ===
Lopez portrays several characters in the music video for "Get Right". (From left to right in order of appearance: the DJ, waitress, dancer, cholas, shy woman and diva, as well as herself in the last two shots.)

The clip begins with a stressed-out female DJ who has to bring her younger sister (played by Marc Anthony's daughter, Arianna Muniz) to work at a nightclub with her because their mother had to work. Her underage sister hides in a corner. A cocktail waitress comforts a saddened friend, who suggests that she go back to work. A go-go dancer is on the phone with her boyfriend, lying by stating that she is at a gay club. A chola complains to her friend about her lover acting up in the club, while her friend calls him an idiot. The DJ hands her sister headphones to listen to the track which she plays, "Get Right". A music video featuring the entertainer dancing with a cane among other settings are displayed on the many screens at the nightclub.

As the song begins, the nightclub gets busier. A celebrity diva enters with her entourage, stunning a shy fan who has come to the club by herself. The shy woman begins to make eye contact with the diva. The go-go dancer takes her position on the counters. The upset chola bolts to the dance-floor to confront her lover, nearly accidentally causing the waitress to trip in the process. She eventually dumps her lover who is staring at the go-go dancer. The shy woman begins to loosen up, ordering more drinks from the waitress, as the dancer also asks for a drink. Towards the song's bridge, the diva sports a smile as she witnesses the shy woman dancing and letting loose. The busy waitress steals a moment to look at the screens, where a classic-Lopez dance-break is being featured. The waitress, diva, shy woman and dancer all begin to immerse themselves in the music. The chola leaves the club. The clip ends with seeing the DJ's face for the first time, smiling at her sister, who is singing to the end of the track cheekily, when the song ends.

== Live performances ==
On January 24, 2005, Lopez performed "Get Right" for the first time live at the 2005 NRJ Music Awards held in Cannes, France. She sported a "sultry" white tuxedo with black lapels. According to The Sydney Morning Herald, the entertainer "electrified the youthful crowd". Lopez made a surprise appearance during Tom Cruise's opening performance at the 2010 MTV Movie Awards, where she performed "Get Right" in a mashup with "Get Back" by Ludacris. The two danced alongside each other and used matching canes.

"Get Right" served as the opening number of her setlist on the Dance Again World Tour, her first worldwide tour which spanned for nearly 80 dates in 2012. She appeared before a group of male dancers with canes and top hats in a "glamorous entrance". She then pulled off her feathered skirt, revealing a sparkling nude catsuit, before shouting "Let's get it!" and commencing the concert with "Get Right". According to Hans Nicholas Jong of The Jakarta Post, the crowd were very receptive of the performance as they let out "rapturous" cheers while grooving to the song's beat. The version of "Get Right" Lopez performed on the Dance Again World Tour was a rock influenced version, which still contained "infectious" horn rifts. Lopez later performed the song as part of her medley during the 2018 MTV Video Music Awards on August 20, 2018, at Radio City Music Hall in New York City.

"Get Right" was featured in Lopez's setlist during the Super Bowl LIV halftime show.

== Track listings ==
- Australian CD maxi single
1. "Get Right" (Album Version) — 3:47
2. "Get Right" (Fabolous Remix) — 3:47
3. "Love Don't Cost a Thing" (RJ Schoolyard Mix) featuring Fat Joe — 4:19
4. "If You Had My Love" (Darkchild Radio Edit) — 4:00
5. "Get Right" (Instrumental Version) — 3:47
- European CD single
1. "Get Right" (Album Version) — 3:47
2. "Get Right" (Album Version) featuring Fabolous — 3:47
- European CD maxi single
1. "Get Right" (Album Version) — 3:47
2. "Love Don't Cost a Thing" (RJ Schoolyard Mix) featuring Fat Joe — 4:19
3. "If You Had My Love" (Dark Child Remix Radio Edit) — 4:00
4. "Get Right" (Instrumental) — 3:47
5. "Get Right" (Video)
- Digital download
1. "Get Right" — 3:45
- Digital download (featuring Fabolous)
1. "Get Right" featuring Fabolous — 3:50
- Digital download (Remix)
1. "Get Right" (Louie Vega Club Mix) — 5:56
2. "Get Right" (Louie Vega Instrumental Mix) — 4:00
3. "Get Right" (Louie Vega Roots Dub) — 6:04
4. "Get Right" (Louie Vega Radio Edit) — 3:28
- 7-inch vinyl
1. "Get Right" (Pop Mix) featuring Fabolous — 3:47
2. "Hold You Down" (Radio Edit) featuring Fat Joe — 3:55
- UK 12-inch vinyl
1. "Get Right" (Album Version) featuring Fabolous — 3:47
2. "Get Right" (Instrumental) — 3:47
3. "Get Right" (Album Version) — 3:47
4. "Feelin' So Good" (Album Version) — 5:30
- US 12-inch vinyl
1. "Get Right" (Album Version) featuring Fabolous — 3:47
2. "Get Right" (Pop Mix) featuring Fabolous — 3:47
3. "Get Right" (Louie Vega Radio Edit) — 3:28
4. "Get Right" (Louie Vega Club Mix) — 5:55
5. "Get Right" (Louie Vega Roots Dub) — 6;05
6. "Get Right" (Louie Vega Instrumental Mix) — 4:00

== Personnel ==
Personnel are adapted from the album booklet of Rebirth.

- Jennifer Lopez – lead vocals
- Chris Avedon – engineering, assistant engineering
- Scotty Beats – engineering
- Rudaina Haddad & Y'Anna Crawley – background vocals
- Rich Harrison – programming, multi instruments, production
- Peter Wade Keusch – engineering, mixing
- Cory Rooney – production, vocal production
- Bruce Swedien – engineering, mixing

== Charts ==
=== Weekly charts ===
| Chart (2005–2006) | Peak position |
|---|---|
| Australia (ARIA) | 3 |
| Austria (Ö3 Austria Top 40) | 11 |
| Belgium (Ultratop 50 Flanders) | 3 |
| Belgium (Ultratop 50 Wallonia) | 2 |
| Canada (Nielsen SoundScan) | 3 |
| Canada CHR/Pop Top 30 (Radio & Records) | 8 |
| CIS Airplay (TopHit) | 17 |
| Croatia International Airplay (HRT) | 2 |
| Czech Republic (IFPI) | 6 |
| Denmark (Tracklisten) | 3 |
| El Salvador (Notimex) | 2 |
| Europe (Eurochart Hot 100) | 1 |
| Finland (Suomen virallinen lista) | 4 |
| France (SNEP) | 2 |
| Germany (GfK) | 7 |
| Greece (IFPI) | 2 |
| Hungary (Rádiós Top 40) | 14 |
| Hungary (Dance Top 40) | 3 |
| Ireland (IRMA) | 1 |
| Italy (FIMI) | 1 |
| Netherlands (Dutch Top 40) | 2 |
| Netherlands (Single Top 100) | 3 |
| Nicaragua (Notimex) | 1 |
| New Zealand (Recorded Music NZ) | 2 |
| Norway (VG-lista) | 7 |
| Peru (Notimex) | 2 |
| Romania (Romanian Top 100) | 3 |
| Russia Airplay (TopHit) | 15 |
| Scottish Singles Sales (Official Charts) | 1 |
| Spain (Promusicae) | 3 |
| Sweden (Sverigetopplistan) | 11 |
| Switzerland (Schweizer Hitparade) | 3 |
| UK Singles (Official Charts) | 1 |
| UK Hip Hop/R&B (Official Charts) | 1 |
| US Billboard Hot 100 | 12 |
| US Dance Club Songs (Billboard) L. Vega remix | 1 |
| US Dance Singles Sales (Billboard) L. Vega remix | 2 |
| US Hot R&B/Hip-Hop Songs (Billboard) | 18 |
| US Pop Airplay (Billboard) | 18 |
| US Rhythmic Airplay (Billboard) | 17 |

Chart performance
| Chart (2026) | Peak position |
|---|---|
| Nigeria Bubbling Under Hot 100 (TurnTable) | 19 |
| Nigeria Airplay (TurnTable) | 82 |

=== Year-end charts ===
| Chart (2005) | Position |
|---|---|
| Australia (ARIA) | 29 |
| Austria (Ö3 Austria Top 40) | 62 |
| Belgium (Ultratop 50 Flanders) | 18 |
| Belgium (Ultratop 50 Wallonia) | 32 |
| Brazil (Crowley) | 44 |
| CIS Airplay (TopHit) | 144 |
| Europe (Eurochart Hot 100) | 11 |
| France (SNEP) | 19 |
| Germany (Media Control GfK) | 56 |
| Hungary (Rádiós Top 40) | 78 |
| Ireland (IRMA) | 17 |
| Italy (FIMI) | 8 |
| Netherlands (Dutch Top 40) | 33 |
| Netherlands (Single Top 100) | 72 |
| New Zealand (RIANZ) | 30 |
| Romania (Romanian Top 100) | 22 |
| Russia Airplay (TopHit) | 129 |
| Sweden (Hitlistan) | 99 |
| Switzerland (Schweizer Hitparade) | 14 |
| UK Singles (OCC) | 23 |
| UK Urban (Music Week) | 18 |
| US Billboard Hot 100 | 82 |
| US Dance Singles Sales (Billboard) | 17 |
| US Mainstream Top 40 (Billboard) | 97 |

== Certifications ==
| Region | Certification | Certified units/sales |
|---|---|---|
| Australia (ARIA) | 2× Platinum | 140,000^{‡} |
| France (SNEP) | Gold | 200,000^{*} |
| Italy | — | 25,000 |
| Mexico (AMPROFON) | Gold | 30,000^{‡} |
| New Zealand (RMNZ) | Gold | 5,000^{*} |
| United Kingdom (BPI) | Platinum | 600,000^{‡} |
| United States (RIAA) Digital | Gold | 500,000^{*} |
| United States (RIAA) Mastertone | Gold | 500,000^{*} |
^{*} Sales figures based on certification alone.^{‡} Sales+streaming figures based on certification alone.

== Release history ==
| Region | Date | Format(s) | Label | Ref. |
|---|---|---|---|---|
| United States | January 3, 2005 | Rhythmic contemporary; contemporary hit radio | Epic | |
| United States | February 1, 2005 | Digital download | Epic | |
| Australia | February 14, 2005 | CD single | Epic | |
| Denmark | February 14, 2005 | CD single | Epic | |
| Germany | February 14, 2005 | CD single | Epic | |
| United Kingdom | February 14, 2005 | 12-inch vinyl; CD single | Epic | |
| United States | March 14, 2005 | 7-inch vinyl | Epic | |
| United Kingdom | April 15, 2005 | Digital download | Epic | |

== See also ==
- List of number-one dance singles of 2005 (U.S.)
