= Dance Again... the Hits =

Greatest hits album by Jennifer Lopez
- Released: July 20, 2012
- Recorded: 1998–2012
- Genres: Dance; Latin pop; R&B
- Length: 52:07
- Label: Epic
- Producers: 7; Marc Anthony; Sean "Puffy" Combs; Emilio Estefan Jr.; GoonRock; Irv Gotti; Kuk Harrell; Rich Harrison; Rodney Jerkins; Richie Jones; Ilya Salmanzadeh; Jennifer Lopez; Dave McPherson; Troy Oliver; Tone & Poke; RedOne; Julio Reyes; Cory Rooney; Ron G.; Kike Santander; Dave Scheuer; Stargate; Ryan Tedder; Ric Wake

Jennifer Lopez chronology
Love? (2011)	Dance Again... the Hits (2012)	A.K.A. (2014)

Singles from Dance Again... the Hits
- 1. "Dance Again" Released: April 2, 2012

Dance Again... the Hits is the first greatest hits album of American singer Jennifer Lopez. It was released on July 20, 2012, by Epic Records, to coincide with the launch of her first world tour, the Dance Again World Tour. Lopez previously conceived plans for a greatest hits album in 2009, but instead opted to use the material recorded for her seventh studio album, Love? (2011), which was released by Island Records in May 2011 after her departure from Epic Records in 2010. As Lopez owed the label one last album to fulfill her contract, she began work on a new greatest hits album in November 2011. She later became unsure whether she wanted to go along with plans to release a greatest hits album or a new studio album, eventually deciding on the former.

Dance Again... the Hits comprises eleven previously released tracks, and two new recordings: "Dance Again" and "Goin' In". A deluxe edition of the album was also released, featuring three additional previously released tracks, and a DVD featuring a selection of eleven music videos. The album received generally positive reviews from music critics, who praised it as a reflection of Lopez's success. Some critics expressed their disappointment in the absence of several successful singles, but deemed this as impressive, noting that this may have been due to the large volume of hit singles she has released over the years. Dance Again... The Hits was a moderate commercial success, peaking within the top ten in fourteen national charts, and the top twenty in ten national charts.

== Background and development ==
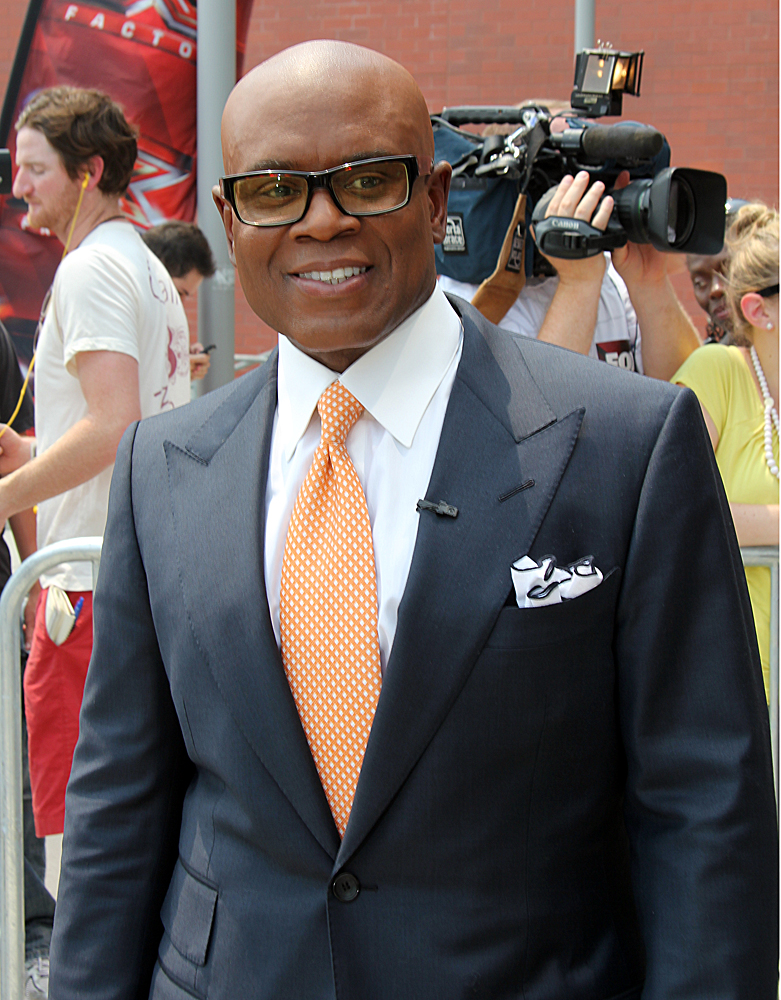
L.A. Reid signed Lopez to Island Records after her departure from Epic Records. He then left Island to head Epic.

Following the commercial failure of her sixth studio album Brave (2007)—and while pregnant with twins Max and Emme—Lopez began working on new music for a future project in 2008. The project was kept under wraps until February 2009 when a new song from the recording sessions titled "Hooked on You" leaked online. Following the leak of "Hooked on You", "One Love" and "What Is Love?" were subsequently leaked online in May. The leaked songs were, at the time, meant to appear on a greatest hits album that later turned into a studio album.

"Louboutins", a song written and produced by The-Dream and C. "Tricky" Stewart, was released as the lead single from her seventh studio album, Love?, in November 2009. However, upon release, the song failed to garner enough airplay to chart, despite topping the US Billboard Hot Dance Club Songs chart. Lopez subsequently left Epic Records in February 2010, citing that she had fulfilled her contractual obligations and now wished to release Love? under a new label. Her departure from the label temporarily halted production on the album, however upon signing a new contract with Island Records, recording resumed on the album. The New York Daily News revealed that Lopez would be taking some of the records recorded under Epic Records to Island Records so that they could be included on the album.

"On the Floor", Lopez's first single with the label, was released in February 2011. The song topped the charts across the globe, becoming one of the most successful singles of the year. Following the release of "On the Floor", Love? produced two moderately successful singles: "I'm Into You" and "Papi", both of which topped the US Billboard Hot Dance Club Songs chart. Love? itself was a moderate commercial success and was viewed as a humble comeback from Lopez, as many had considered her recording career over. It was announced in November that Lopez was again working on new material for a greatest hits album. The following month, Lopez revealed that she had been playing some of her new music for L.A. Reid, who signed her to Island Records and left the label to become the CEO and chairman of Epic Records. This led further speculation that Lopez had moved back to Epic Records, which was first reported in July. The reports were later confirmed untrue, as Lopez was back with Epic Records because she owed the label one final album to end her contract, despite previously announcing that she had fulfilled her contract with them.

== New material ==
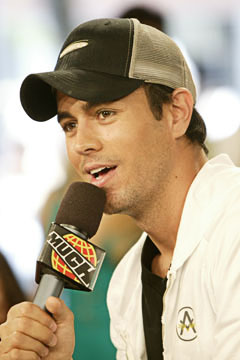
Lopez begged Enrique Iglesias to let her record "Dance Again", telling him that it was "her song".

Lopez began working on a "collection of songs" in 2011, unaware of what she was "going to do with them". At the time, she was deciding whether she wanted to release a greatest hits album or a new studio album. Lopez stated that when it comes time to make an album, she doesn't sit down and write for the entire thing. She revealed that she is always working on new music and that her albums "happen organically" when she has recorded enough material. Lopez explained: "I don't ever stop. I keep going with it. These records, like 'Follow the Leader,' [a collaboration with Puerto Rican duo Wisin & Yandel] they just kind of came about. It wasn't something like, 'Oh, I'm going to sit down and make a record right now.'" Among the songs she recorded, two were chosen to be included on Dance Again... The Hits: "Dance Again" and "Goin' In".

The album's title and opening track, "Dance Again", was written by RedOne, Enrique Iglesias, Bilal "The Chef", AJ Junior and Pitbull, who is also featured in the song. After hearing a demo version of the track, she begged Iglesias to let her record the song, telling him that it was "her song". Lopez, who was going through a divorce with Marc Anthony and the "breakup of a family", felt as if the song had come to her at the "perfect moment". According to Lopez, the period was devastating because family is very important to her. Lopez revealed: "I had to turn that into something better"; she thought: "I don't want to just survive it, I want to come out better than that." Lopez didn't want to be "the woman who stayed in bed for months". "I knew I had to get through it. I'd dance every day, I'd work out, I'd say a little prayer and I still wouldn't feel any better. Then I'd go to bed and get up the next day and do it all again. It was a process, and it very gradually got a little easier ... I had to do it for my kids. I had to get through it for them." She re-wrote parts of the verses to better relate to her experiences. The song "helped lift her out of the darkness" and gave her hope again. Looking back on the song in December 2012, Lopez stated that: "'Dance Again' became my anthem ... an expression of what I needed to do at that time in my life and for what I was taking on with [my career]. It was a beautiful metaphor that became my reality."

Lopez's vocals for "Dance Again" were arranged by RedOne and produced by Kuk Harrell. They were recorded at Pinky's Palace. Pitbull's vocals were recorded by Al Burna at Al Burna Studios, Miami, Florida. Chris "Tek" O'Ryan and Trevor Muzzy handled audio engineering of the song, with assistance from Anthony Falcone and Peter Mack. O'Ryan and Trevor Muzzy were in charge of vocal editing. All instruments in the song were played and programmed by RedOne, who also produced the song. The song was later mixed by Trevor Muzzy. In an interview with Ryan Seacrest, Lopez revealed that she loved being able to collaborate with RedOne and Pitbull again. She stated: "We had a great chemistry the last time, and it was like 'We're going to have to do something again.' And this was the perfect song. I love the message of the song. That when something bad happens, your life is not over. You have to get up. You're gonna live. You're gonna to be okay. You're gonna dance again."

"Goin' In" was written by Michael Warren, Jamahl Listenbee, Joseph Angel, Coleridge Tillman, David Quiñones and Tramar Dillard. Lopez's vocals were produced by Harrell and recorded at Pinky's Palace. Josh Gudwin and O'Ryan handled audio engineering of the song, with assistance from Falcone and Mack. The song features additional vocals from American rapper Lil Jon. GoonRock produced and later mixed the song alongside Kenny Moran at The House on the Hill Studios in Los Angeles, California. Of GoonRock, Lopez commented by stating that he is "very forward with his sound". After recording her vocals for the song, Flo Rida recorded a rap verse for the song. Those involved in the production of the song were extremely happy with the song before Flo Rida's rap appeared on it, but once his vocals were on the song it "took it over the top top". When choosing who she wanted to feature on the song, Lopez had several other rappers in mind, such as Big Sean. Lopez revealed: "We had a couple of people who said yes, that they would get on it, but [Flo Rida] just seemed like the perfect one." She further explained that the style of the song "really fit Flo Rida"; "It was half-dance, but half kind of hard too."

== Critical reception ==
Professional ratings
Aggregate scores
Source	Rating
Metacritic	72/100
Review scores
Source	Rating
AllMusic	4/5 stars
Digital Spy	4/5 stars
Slant Magazine	3.5/5 stars
Sputnikmusic	2/5 stars

Dance Again... The Hits received generally positive reviews from contemporary music critics. At Metacritic, which assigns a normalized rating out of 100 to reviews from mainstream critics, the album received an average score of 72, based on four reviews, which indicates "generally favorable reviews". Sal Cinquemani of Slant Magazine wrote that the "most immediately striking thing" about the compilation is "just how many hits [she] has racked up over the years". "So many, in fact, that there's a hefty handful of singles missing from the standard edition of the album", using her number-one single "All I Have" as an example of this. He stated that Lopez's "output has been nothing if not on trend", and that Dance Again... The Hits plays not only as a chronicle of her music career, but of "pop music as a whole since just before the turn of the century", with genres spanning Latin pop, dance, and R&B. According to Cinquemani, the album also serves as a "historical record" of who the rappers du jour were "over the last dozen years or so", from Big Pun, Fat Joe, Ja Rule, and Lil Wayne. He concluded by stating that if the compilation "proves anything" it's that Lopez is, "if not the queen, then at least the duchess of reinvention and should never be counted out".

Michael Cragg of BBC Music wrote that it's "surprising that she hadn't unleashed a hits collection before now given that she's what you might politely call a 'singles artist'". He questioned the song choices, writing that the person who made the decision to not include "Papi" needs to have a "long, hard look in the mirror", although it's "hard to argue with most of what's on offer", Lopez "slipping effortlessly into different guises with each song". He concluded by stating that: "A cipher for good songs rather than the reasons those songs are good she may be, but there are few that do it better". Lewis Corner of Digital Spy too questioned the decisions of which songs appeared on the album, but wrote that: "the very fact that she can't fit all her classics on to one disc can be seen as nothing more than a testament to her enduring career". AllMusic's Stephen Thomas Erlewine pointed out that Lopez's other well or moderately charted songs such as "Play", "I'm Gonna Be Alright", "I'm Glad", and "Hold You Down" were not present on the compilation, while also writing that her older hits did not fit neatly with her newer songs and that its sequencing was "scattershot". Erlewine, nonetheless, said that "[the album] does have the familiar tunes, so it serves its purpose".

Irving Tan of Sputnikmusic put Dance Again... The Hits into the category of a greatest hits album that "you get facial brickbat of moderate-to-raw disappointment at the discovery of how thin and forced the artist's discography really is". He wrote that having another artist featured on nine of the thirteen tracks "gives the impression that as a product, having Jennifer Lopez alone is simply not enough". He further criticized the decision to include the Murder remixes of "Ain't It Funny" and "I'm Real" over the original studio versions, stating that it was almost like "Sony Music held their hands up and admitted that the initial cuts that they published simply weren't up to scratch". Tan concluded that for a greatest hits album, the track listing is "simply all over the place", with no indication that the record executives or Lopez "looked around for a logical start" or an "easy access ramp to her seven-album canon".

== Commercial performance ==
Dance Again... the Hits enjoyed moderate commercial success in the United States, peaking at number 20 on the Billboard 200 the week of its debut with sales of 14,000 copies. The album performed better on the Billboard R&B/Hip-Hop Albums component chart, where it managed to reach number six. After a month, the album had sold 38,000 copies in the United States. As of December 2012, Dance Again... the Hits is Lopez's second lowest charting effort in the country; only The Reel Me achieved a lower chart position in 2003, peaking at number 69. As of July 2020, the album has sold 126,000 copies in the United States. On the UK Albums Chart, Dance Again... the Hits debuted at number four with sales of 9,213 copies in its first week of release, matching the peak of J to Tha L-O!: The Remixes in that country.

Overseas, Dance Again... the Hits performed well in most music markets, reaching the top ten in fourteen national charts, five of which were in the first five positions. Its highest position came from the Canadian Albums chart, where the album achieved number three. The album reached the same peak on the Italian Albums chart. Other countries where the album managed to score a high peak were Spain (number five), the Czech Republic (number six) and Switzerland (number seven). In France, the album debuted at number 12 and spent 10 weeks in the French Albums Chart, becoming her last studio album to miss the top ten until her last two studio albums, A.K.A. (2014) and This Is Me...Now (2024). On the Australian Albums Chart, the album had a moderate commercial performance, reaching number 20; her previous compilation album, J to tha L–O! The Remixes, achieved a higher position of number 11. In Latin America, the album appeared on the Mexican Album chart, reaching a peak of number 10.

== Track listing ==
Dance Again... the Hits – Standard edition
No.	Title	Writer(s)	Producer(s)	Length
1.	"Dance Again" (featuring Pitbull)	RedOne; Enrique Iglesias; Bilal "The Chef"; AJ Junior; Armando Perez	RedOne; Kuk Harrell^{[a]}	3:57
2.	"Goin' In" (featuring Flo Rida)	Michael Warren; Jamahl Listenbee; Joseph Angel; Coleridge Tillman; Josh Stevens; David Quinones; Tramar Dillard	GoonRock; Harrell^{[a]}	4:09
3.	"I'm Into You" (featuring Lil Wayne)	Taio Cruz; Mikkel S. Eriksen; Tor Erik Hermansen; Dwayne Carter	Stargate; Harrell^{[a]}	3:20
4.	"On the Floor" (featuring Pitbull)	RedOne; Kinda Hamid; Junior; Teddy Sky; Bilal "The Chef"; Perez; Gonzalo Hermosa; Ulises Hermosa	RedOne; Harrell^{[a]}	4:46
5.	"Love Don't Cost a Thing"	Damon Sharpe; Greg Lawson; Georgette Franklin; Jeremy Monroe; Amille D. Harris	Ric Wake; Cory Rooney; Richie Jones; Jennifer Lopez^{[b]}	3:42
6.	"If You Had My Love"	Rodney Jerkins; LaShawn Daniels; Rooney	Jerkins; Rooney^{[b]}; Lopez^{[b]}	4:25
7.	"Waiting for Tonight"	Maria Christensen; Michael Garvin; Phil Temple	Wake; Jones; Dave Scheuer	4:06
8.	"Get Right" (featuring Fabolous)	Rich Harrison; Usher Raymond; John Jackson; James Brown	Harrison; Rooney^{[c]}	3:51
9.	"Jenny from the Block" (Track Masters Remix featuring Styles P. and Jadakiss)	Lopez; Troy Oliver; Mr. Deyo; Samuel Barnes; Jean Claude Olivier; Jose Fernando Arbex Miro; Lawrence Parker; Scott Sterling; Michael Oliver; David Styles; Jason Phillips	T. Oliver; Rooney; Poke & Tone	3:09
10.	"I'm Real (Murder Remix)" (featuring Ja Rule)	Lopez; T. Oliver; Rooney; L.E.S.; Jeffrey Atkins; Irving Lorenzo; Rick James	Irv Gotti; 7; Rooney^{[b]}; Lopez^{[b]}	4:18
11.	"Do It Well"	Frank Wilson; Leonard Caston; Anita Poree; Ryan Tedder	Rooney; Tedder	3:08
12.	"Ain't It Funny (Murder Remix)" (featuring Ja Rule and Caddillac Tah)	Lopez; Rooney; Lorenzo; Atkins; Caddillac Tah; Ashanti Douglas	Irv Gotti; 7	3:51
13.	"Feelin' So Good" (featuring Big Pun and Fat Joe)	Sean "Puffy" Combs; Steven Standard; Lopez; Rooney; Christopher Rios; Joseph Cartagena	Combs; Rooney^{[b]}; Lopez^{[b]}	5:25
Total length:				52:07

Dance Again... the Hits – Deluxe edition bonus tracks
No.	Title	Writer(s)	Producer(s)	Length
14.	"All I Have" (featuring LL Cool J)	Lopez; James Todd Smith; Makeba Riddick; Curtis Richardson; Ron G.; Dave McPherson; William Peters; Lisa Peters	Rooney; Ron G.; McPherson	4:17
15.	"Qué Hiciste"	Marc Anthony; Julio Reyes; Jimena Romero	Anthony; Reyes	4:58
16.	"Let's Get Loud"	Gloria Estefan; Kike Santander	Emilio Estefan Jr.; Santander; Rooney^{[b]}; Lopez^{[b]}	3:58
Total length:				65:20

Dance Again... the Hits – iTunes Store deluxe edition (bonus videos)
No.	Title	Director(s)	Length
17.	"Love Don't Cost a Thing" (music video)	Dave Meyers	5:07
18.	"If You Had My Love" (music video)	Paul Hunter	5:29
19.	"Feelin' So Good" (featuring Big Pun and Fat Joe) (music video)	Hunter	5:36

Dance Again... the Hits – Deluxe edition (DVD)
No.	Title	Director(s)	Length
1.	"Dance Again" (featuring Pitbull)	Hunter	4:27
2.	"On the Floor" (featuring Pitbull)	TAJ Stansberry	4:27
3.	"Love Don't Cost a Thing"	Meyers	5:08
4.	"If You Had My Love"	Hunter	5:30
5.	"Waiting for Tonight"	Francis Lawrence	4:10
6.	"Get Right"	Lawrence	5:05
7.	"Jenny from the Block"	Lawrence	4:05
8.	"I'm Real (Murder Remix)" (featuring Ja Rule)	Meyers	4:05
9.	"Do It Well"	David LaChapelle	3:19
10.	"Ain't It Funny (Murder Remix)" (featuring Ja Rule and Caddillac Tah)	Cris Judd	3:52
11.	"Feelin' So Good" (featuring Big Pun and Fat Joe)	Hunter	5:37

Notes

- ^{^a} signifies a vocal producer
- ^{^b} signifies an executive producer
- ^{^c} signifies a remixer

== Credits and personnel ==
Credits for Dance Again... the Hits adapted from AllMusic.

- Josie Aiello – background vocals
- Mert Alas – photography
- Justin Angel – background vocals
- Jim Annunziato – mixing, vocal engineer
- Tom Barney – bass
- Jane Barrett – background vocals
- Scotty Beatz – engineer
- Big Pun – vocals
- B-Money – scratching
- Al Burna – engineer, vocal engineer
- Michael "Banger" Cadahia – vocal engineer
- Caddillac Tah – vocals
- Maria Christiansen – background vocals
- Sean "Puffy" Combs – producer
- Margret Dorn – background vocals
- Ashanti Douglas – background vocals
- Tony Duran – photography
- Mikkel S. Eriksen – engineer, instrumentation
- Fabolous – vocals
- Fat Joe – featured artist
- Jose Fernando – vocals
- Flo Rida – vocals
- Alessandro Giulini – accordion
- Larry Gold – arranger, conductor
- GoMillion – photography
- GoonRock – mixing, producer
- Irv Gotti – mixing, producer
- Franklyn Grant – engineer
- Josh Gudwin – engineer, vocal engineer
- Kuk Harrell – producer, vocal arrangement, vocal editing, vocal engineer, vocal producer, background vocals
- Shawnyette Harrell – background vocals
- Rich Harrison – producer
- Alexei Hay – photography
- Tor Erik Hermansen – instrumentation
- Dan Hetzel – engineer, mixing
- Jean-Marie Horvat – mixing
- Ja Rule – vocals
- Jadakiss – vocals
- Jim Janik – mixing
- Rodney Jerkins – producer
- Richie Jones – arranger, drums, mixing, percussion, producer, programming, remixing
- Jennifer Karr – background vocals
- Peter Wade Keusch – engineer
- Eric Kupper – keyboards
- Dave Kutch – mastering
- Greg Lawson – arranger
- Damien Lewis – assistant engineer, engineer
- Lil Jon – vocals
- Lil Wayne – featured artist
- Jennifer Lopez – vocals
- Peter Mack – assistant
- Bill Makina – programming
- Manny Marroquin – mixing
- Milwaukee Buck – engineer
- Chieli Minucci – guitar
- Kenny Moran – mixing
- Trevor Muzzy – engineer, mixing, vocal editing
- Troy Oliver – drum programming, producer
- Jeanette Olsson – background vocals
- Chris "Tek" O'Ryan – engineer, vocal editing
- Marty Osterer – bass
- Julian Peploe – art direction, design
- Wendy Peterson – background vocals
- Marcus Piggott – photography
- Pitbull – vocals
- Poke and Tone – producer
- Prince Charles – engineer, mixing
- Rita Quintero – background vocals
- Natasha Ramos – background vocals
- RedOne – engineer, instrumentation, producer, programming, vocal arrangement, vocal editing, vocal producer
- Julio Reyes – engineer
- Cory Rooney – engineer, producer, remixing
- Marc Russell – assistant producer
- Dave Scheuer – arranger, engineer, producer
- Brian Springer – engineer, mixing
- Stargate – producer
- Styles P – vocals
- Bruce Swedien – engineer
- David Swope – engineer
- Phil Tan – mixing
- Ryan Tedder – engineer, producer
- Michael Thompson – photography
- Ric Wake – arranger, producer
- Miles Walker – engineer
- Robb Williams – engineer
- Thomas R. Yezzi – engineer

== Charts ==
=== Weekly charts ===
Chart (2012)	Peak position
Australian Albums (ARIA)	20
Austrian Albums (Ö3 Austria)	22
Belgian Albums (Ultratop Flanders)	9
Belgian Albums (Ultratop Wallonia)	10
Canadian Albums (Billboard)	3
Czech Albums (ČNS IFPI)	6
Dutch Albums (Album Top 100)	17
Finnish Albums (Suomen virallinen lista)	12
French Albums (SNEP)	12
German Albums (Offizielle Top 100)	15
Greek Albums (IFPI)	53
Hungarian Albums (MAHASZ)	10
Irish Albums (IRMA)	10
Italian Albums (FIMI)	3
Japanese Albums (Oricon)	11
Mexican Albums (Top 100 Mexico)	10
New Zealand Albums (RMNZ)	12
Polish Albums (ZPAV)	11
Portuguese Albums (AFP)	10
Scottish Albums (Official Charts)	8
Spanish Albums (Promusicae)	5
Swedish Albums (Sverigetopplistan)	44
Swiss Albums (Schweizer Hitparade)	7
UK Albums (Official Charts)	4
UK R&B Albums (Official Charts)	4
US Billboard 200	20
US Top R&B/Hip-Hop Albums (Billboard)	6

=== Year-end charts ===
Chart (2012)	Position
US Top R&B/Hip-Hop Albums (Billboard)	85

== Certifications ==
Region	Certification	Certified units/sales
New Zealand (RMNZ)	Gold	7,500^{‡}
United Kingdom (BPI)	Platinum	300,000^{‡}
^{‡} Sales+streaming figures based on certification alone.

== Release history ==
Country	Date	Edition	Label	Ref.
Germany	July 20, 2012	Standard (CD); deluxe (CD+DVD)	Sony	
Netherlands	July 20, 2012	Standard (CD); deluxe (CD+DVD)	Sony	
France	July 23, 2012	Standard (CD); deluxe (CD+DVD)	RCA	
United Kingdom	July 23, 2012	Standard (CD); deluxe (CD+DVD)	RCA	
Canada	July 24, 2012	Standard (CD); deluxe (CD+DVD)	Sony	
United States	July 24, 2012	Standard (CD); deluxe (CD+DVD)	Epic	
Australia	July 27, 2012	Deluxe (CD+DVD)	Sony	
Japan	August 1, 2012	Standard (CD); deluxe (CD+DVD)	Sony	
Australia	September 28, 2012	Standard (CD)	Sony	

== See also ==
- 2012 in American music
