= Papi (Jennifer Lopez song) =

2011 single by Jennifer Lopez

Single by Jennifer Lopez

from the album Love?
- Released: August 10, 2011
- Recorded: 2010
- Studio: Cove Studio (New York City); Henson Studios (Los Angeles)
- Genre: Dance pop; Latin pop Eurodance
- Length: 3:43
- Label: Island
- Songwriters: RedOne; AJ Junior; BeatGeek; Teddy Sky; Bilal "The Chef"; Jimmy Joker
- Producers: RedOne; BeatGeek; Jimmy Joker; Kuk Harrell

Jennifer Lopez singles chronology
"I'm Into You" (2011)	"Papi" (2011)	"T.H.E. (The Hardest Ever)" (2011)

Music video
- "Papi" on YouTube

"Papi" is a song recorded by American singer Jennifer Lopez for her seventh studio album Love? (2011). The Latin-flavored dance song was written by RedOne, AJ Junior, BeatGeek, Teddy Sky, Bilal Hajji and Jimmy Joker, and produced by RedOne, BeatGeak and Jimmy Joker. The lyrical content of the song revolves around Lopez's love to dance for her man. The song was due to be released as a promotional single to help promote the album on April 19, 2011, but the song was unlocked and released on April 17, 2011, through a campaign on Lopez's Facebook page. "Papi" received praise from music critics, stating that it was one of the highlights from Love?.

"Papi" received a full commercial release as Love?'s third single starting on August 10, 2011. On October 27, 2011 "Papi" became Lopez's 11th number one single on the Billboard Hot Dance Club Songs Chart. It reached the top-ten in Bulgaria, Finland, Israel, and Italy, where it peaked at number 3. A music video was released for the song and it was directed by Paul Hunter, who had previously worked with her for videos including her 2000 hit "Love Don't Cost a Thing". The plot of the video involves Jennifer Lopez eating a mysterious love cookie, and the next morning a mob of men go crazy for her, chasing her all over the city.

== Background and release ==
Work on Lopez's seventh studio album commenced in early 2009 after leaked demos of the tracks "One Love" and "(What Is) Love?" surfaced online, with Lopez claiming they were not going to be the first singles (though they were eventually featured on the album), saying that "I just love making great pop/dance music with beautiful lyrics, and that's what I always kind of go for." In 2010, she revealed the album's title, Love?, and in January 2011, she released "On the Floor" as the album's lead-single. During an interview for BlackBook magazine, the song's producer RedOne commented on the album's status, claiming they worked on eight songs. He also stated, "Musically, I'm trying to combine all the elements that makes her who she is. [...] We connected, and it was easy to work together." During the 53rd Annual Grammy Awards red carpet, RedOne once again commented on the collaboration, also opening about his role as also an executive producer on the album, while adding: "The sound, as you might guess, nods to Lopez's roots — but it's more than that. "A little bit of the Latin flavor is infused in it, but I would describe it more as a global sound. It is all about love and covers all emotional sides of Jennifer. She is in a good place."

The album suffered multiple delays until it was released on May 3, 2011, in the United States via Island Records. "Papi" was scheduled for release as the second of three promotional singles from the album, following the album's campaign "Give It Love, Get It Early", which used the "like" button on Facebook in order to "unlock" the tracks on Facebook; the other songs included "I'm Into You" (released previously and becoming the second single) and "(What Is) Love" (released subsequently). Its initial scheduled release date was April 13, 2011, until it moved to April 19, 2011, and it eventually was released three days early, after a preview was posted on Lopez's "Like for Love?" campaign, whereby the Love?'s three promotional singles were released early if enough fans "liked" them through Facebook. The opening portion of the song is used in the dance-breakdown present in the music video for Lopez's second Love? single, "I'm Into You" (2011), hinting it would become a possible third single. In July, Lopez revealed plans to release "Papi" as a single. The song indeed became the album's third single, being initially released to Italian radio stations on August 10, 2011, and later it impacted US contemporary hit and rhythmic radio simultaneously on September 26, 2011.

== Music and lyrics ==
"Papi"
A 22 second sample of the song, with Lopez singing the chorus over a Latin and electro background.

Written by RedOne, AJ Junior, BeatGeek, Teddy Sky, Bilal Hajji and Jimmy Joker, and produced by RedOne, BeatGeak and Jimmy Joker, "Papi" is a Latin and electro-flavored, up-tempo dance track that runs for 3:43 (three minutes and forty-three seconds). Kuk Harrell and RedOne are the vocal producers of the song. The melody is driven by "beating" drums and "pounding" synths. According to Rick Florino, from ArtistDirect, the song also uses elements of "propulsive house" music. It starts with a "quick siren swell[ing] before morph[ing] into a bombastic tribal build-up as synths snap in and out of the sound. As noted by Florino, Lopez's voice "pulsates with a fresh, fiery, and focused energy that captivates listeners hypnotically." Florino also described the song's middle-8 breakdown as "a bass thump and seductive Spanish lines [that] pulsate in tandem before one final crescendo of the chorus." Poppy Reid of The Music Network observed the song "is more reminiscent of the Brave circa 2007 album when she discovered dance-pop."

The lyrics center around Lopez's love for dancing for her man, even if he is not right next to her, with Lopez singing in the chorus: "Move your body, move your body / Dance for your papi". On the line "My rock is shinin’ bright / Even if he ain’t by my side / He makes sure that I glow / I make sure everybody knows," J. Lo sings of her man, who is not around the club but whose presence is sparkling on her finger. Amanda Hensel of PopCrush noted that the song "gives a clear message, so you don't have to read between the lines. If you care about your significant other, you might just want to show off those moves like Lopez suggests ... Repeatedly." For Bob Hoose, editor of Plugged In, the song "encourages women to let their men objectify them on the dance floor."

== Critical reception ==
"Papi" was celebrated by most music critics. Joe Guerra from The Houston Chronicle called the song one of Love?'s "best moments," describing it as a "aggressively sexual anthem that [is] likely to soundtrack the summer. Rick Florino, writing for Artistdirect, gave the song 5 out of 5 stars in his review, agreeing that "Lopez [is] at her finest". Florino further praised Lopez's voice, noting that it "pulsates with a fresh, fiery, and focused energy" while also commenting that "her unique delivery brandishes traditional Latin flare, [that] captivates listeners hypnotically." He ended by praising the song's memorable chorus and "majestic hook", claiming Lopez to be "one of pop’s most forward-thinking luminaries, lighting up airwaves, dance floors, and iPods with a sound that's all her own." PopCrush writer Amanda Hensel rated it four-and-a-half stars out of five, naming "Papi" "spicy hot — just like the Puerto Rican, Bronx-raised herself." [...] "It's a perfect fit for any club packed full of dance-hungry people, and all-in-all, exemplifies what we love about the singer/actress." Entertainment Weekly's Adam Markovitz named it "stoop-party-ready" [...] "with just enough hints of Latin spice to remind listeners of Jenny's from-the-block past without losing sight of her Bel Air present."

In his track-by-track review, Digital Spy's Robert Copsey wrote that "Papi' deserved a "standalone release", calling it a "standout", where "she carries it off with her unrivalled glamour and effortless sophistication." Genevieve Koski of The A.V. Club also noted the song to be a highlight, for "steamrolling right over them with a blistering beat and a healthy dash of Auto-Tune". Writing for BBC Music, Alex McApherson also mentioned both songs for having "apparent distillations of the trashy Miami house aesthetic that dominates pop these days." Chad Grischow of IGN noted that "the album is at its best when the pace is cranked up on the club bangers, with the thrusting synth and beat assault of "Papi" finding Lopez singing about dancing for her man even if he is not right next to her." Monica Herrera wrote favorably for Billboard that "the pro-monogamy house trend revived by RiRi's "Only Girl," still going strong here," citing it to be "fun, harmless, & strictly for Jenny's Latina fans." Sal Cinquemani of Slant Magazine described it as a "vapid yet hard-to-resist Eurotrash" track.

== Chart performance ==
For the week ending April 27, 2011, following its release as a promotional single, "Papi" debuted on the US Billboard Hot 100 at number 99. Ultimately, after being released as a single, it peaked at number 96 and spent three weeks on the chart, becoming her lowest-peaking entry on the Hot 100 at the time. "Papi" fared somewhat better on the US Billboard Pop Songs chart, where it peaked at number 33, becoming the third song from the album to chart on the Pop Songs ranking, becoming her first album since This Is Me... Then (2002) to do so. It charted inside the top-forty in countries such as Austria, Belgium, France, Hungary, Slovakia, and Spain. In Finland, it debuted straight at number 9, becoming her seventh top-ten single. "Papi" peaked higher in Italy, where it became a huge hit there, where it peaked at number 3, becoming her ninth top-ten hit on the Italian charts.

== Music video ==
=== Background ===
The music video was shot in August 2011 in downtown Los Angeles. It was directed by Paul Hunter, who previously directed her music videos for "If You Had My Love" (1999) and "Love Don't Cost a Thing" (2001). A portion of the video was shown on September 16, 2011, on Good Morning America. The full video premiered on September 19, 2011, on Vevo. The music video was edited into a 31-second commercial, promoting the Fiat 500, the car in which Lopez is driving in the music video.

=== Synopsis ===
The music video begins with the words "Love? Happens". The video continues with Lopez holding her BlackBerry Bold 9900 and chatting with her apartment mail attendant Lisa. They talk about Lopez's love interest; she is disappointed because her lover, who is a colonel in the United States Air Force; has not returned from deployment yet. Lisa then hands over the mail and offers her a cookie which she claims will bring her man back to her. Lisa is careful to tell her to take only a small bite owing to the strength of the cookie, but Lopez accidentally takes too big a bite. The following morning the captivating spell of the cookie takes hold and as Lopez leaves her apartment building she attracts the attention of a man who steals a rose to present to her, only to be tackled by another man. As she walks on through the streets of the city she draws the affection of an ever-increasing number of men, including a gardener, a businessman and a motorcyclist, who fight among one another while Lopez walks on oblivious to the chaos behind her. Lopez finally reaches her car (a Fiat 500) but is swarmed by the group of men who chase her with gifts of flowers and a puppy. The mob eventually outmaneuvers and corners Lopez, forcing her from the car. They proceed to dance around her in a complex display of choreography. She tells the men to stop and quickly discovers that she can control how close they get to her by using her body positions. She manages to lead the men in a quick choreographed sequence before the men all lift her from the ground. Her lover then emerges from a bus and rescues her and the crowd quickly dissipates, leaving the pair to drive away in Lopez's car. The video ends with a shocked Lopez trying in vain to explain to her lover the events she endured throughout the day.

=== Reception ===
Idolator's Becky Bain perceived that the clip was "clearly a rejected concept" for a "Lopez-starring romantic comedy", while comparing it to her films The Wedding Planner, The Back-Up Plan and Maid in Manhattan. Bain noted that in the music video, Lopez "attempts to do two things with her new video: first, make herself more rateable by a creating comedic, tongue-in-cheek clip. And secondly, show people how extremely desirable she is by having hundreds of men literally fling themselves off buildings and crash through breakaway glass to win her affections." Billboard's Jason Lipshut was unsure about the storyline, but praised the "cheeky choreography" as a "charming nod to Lopez's past videos." The Huffington Post gave the music video a positive review, writing "Ms. Lopez has still got it – "Jenny from the Block" breaks into a signature group dance number and kills it!"

== Live performances ==
Lopez first performed the song at the iHeart Radio Festival on September 24, 2011. She wore a red-fringed mini-dress. Lopez had previously announced the festival herself, which included Lady Gaga, Coldplay, Alicia Keys and Bruno Mars among several others. She stated: "It's going to be this amazing concert ... to launch the new iHeartRadio, where you can kind of customize your own radio stations [sic] So, it's pretty exciting. I'm glad to be doing it." The following month on October 22, she performed the song during her headlining concert at Mohegan Sun to celebrate its 15th anniversary. Lopez performed "Papi" at the 39th American Music Awards on November 20. It was a part of a medley, along with "Until It Beats No More" and "On the Floor", which Pitbull assisted her with. The performance of the song was almost a replica of the video; a Fiat car which she endorsed was included on stage. She was criticized for using the Fiat as part of her performance. The costume she wore, which consisted of a near-nude body suit with glitter covering necessary places, has been said to resemble the outfit Britney Spears wore in the music video for "Toxic" (2004). Additionally, "Papi" was included on the set list for her 2012 Dance Again World Tour.

== Track listing ==
- Digital download
1. "Papi" — 3:40
- Digital download (Remixes)
1. "Papi" (Rosabel Radio Edit) — 3:26
2. "Papi" (Mixin Marc & Tony Svedja Radio) — 3:40
3. "Papi" (R3hab Radio) – 3:37
4. "Papi" (It's the DJ Kue Radio Mix!) — 3:53
5. "Papi" (Rosabel Vocal Club Mix) — 7:29
6. "Papi" (Mixin Marc & Tony Svedja Extended) — 6:33
7. "Papi" (R3hab Club) — 4:53
8. "Papi" (It's the DJ Kue Extended Mix!) — 5:34
9. "Papi" (Rosabel Attitude Dub) — 7:56
10. "Papi" (Mixin Marc & Tony Svedja Dub) — 6:17
11. "Papi" (R3hab Instrumental) — 4:53
12. "Papi" (It's the DJ Kue Instrumental!) — 5:35
- Dimitri Vegas & Like Mike Remix
1. "Papi" (Dimitri Vegas & Like Mike Remix) — 3:22

== Credits and personnel ==
Technical

"Papi" was recorded at Cove Studio in New York City and Henson Recording Studios in Los Angeles.

Personnel

- Jim Annunziato – vocal recording
- BeatGeek – producer, songwriter, instruments & programming
- Josh Gudwin – vocal recording, vocal editor
- Bilal Hajji – songwriter
- Kuk Harrell – vocal producer, vocal recording, background vocals
- Jimmy Joker – producer, songwriter
- AJ Junior – songwriter
- Nadir "RedOne" Khayat – producer, songwriter, vocal editor, vocal arranger, recording engineer, instruments & programming
- Jennifer Lopez – lead vocalist
- Trevor Muzzy – audio mixer, recording engineer
- Chris "TEK" O'Ryan – vocal editor, recording engineer
- Jeanette Olsson – background vocals
- Geraldo "Teddy Sky" Sandell – songwriter

== Charts ==
=== Weekly charts ===
Weekly chart performance for "Papi"
Chart (2011–2012)	Peak position
Austria (Ö3 Austria Top 40)	24
Belgium (Ultratop 50 Flanders)	23
Belgium Dance (Ultratop Flanders)	25
Belgium (Ultratop 50 Wallonia)	28
Belgium Dance (Ultratip Wallonia)	13
Bulgaria (IFPI)	5
Brazil (Billboard Hot 100 Airplay)	72
Canada Hot 100 (Billboard)	50
Czech Republic Airplay (ČNS IFPI)	13
Finland (Suomen virallinen lista)	9
France (SNEP)	28
Global Dance Tracks (Billboard)	16
Greece Digital Songs (Billboard)	5
Hungary (Editors' Choice Top 40)	39
Israel International Airplay (Media Forest)	8
Italy (FIMI)	3
Lebanon (The Official Lebanese Top 20)	14
Netherlands (Dutch Top 40 Tipparade)	7
Netherlands (Single Top 100)	68
Poland (Dance Top 50)	15
Poland (Video Chart)	4
Romania (Romanian Top 100)	52
Scottish Singles Sales (Official Charts)	60
Slovakia Airplay (ČNS IFPI)	12
South Korea (Gaon International Download Chart)	186
Spain (Promusicae)	18
Switzerland (Schweizer Hitparade)	37
UK Singles (Official Charts)	67
UK Hip Hop/R&B (Official Charts)	18
Ukraine Airplay (TopHit) Rosabel Radio	16
US Billboard Hot 100	96
US Dance Club Songs (Billboard)	1
US Latin Pop Airplay (Billboard)	33
US Latin Rhythm Airplay (Billboard)	20
US Pop Songs (Billboard)	33

=== Year-end charts ===
Annual chart rankings for "Papi"
Chart (2011)	Position
Italy (Musica e dischi)	70
Ukraine Airplay (TopHit)	187
US Hot Dance Club Songs (Billboard)	18
Chart (2012)	Position
Poland (ZPAV)	17
Ukraine Airplay (TopHit)	92

== Certifications ==
Certifications and sales for "Papi"
Region	Certification	Certified units/sales
Brazil (Pro-Música Brasil)	Platinum	60,000^{‡}
Canada (Music Canada)	Gold	40,000^{*}
Italy (FIMI)	Platinum	30,000^{*}
^{*} Sales figures based on certification alone.^{‡} Sales+streaming figures based on certification alone.

== Release history ==
Street dates for "Papi"
Country	Date	Format	Label	Ref.
Various	April 17, 2011	Digital download (promotional single)	Island	
Italy	August 10, 2011	Contemporary hit radio	Universal	
United States	September 13, 2011	Digital download (remixes)	Island	
United States	September 26, 2011	Mainstream radio	Island	
United States	September 26, 2011	Rhythmic radio	Island	
Spain	October 19, 2011	Digital download (remixes)	Universal	
Italy	November 15, 2011	Digital download (remixes)	Universal	
Germany	November 25, 2011	Digital download (remixes)	Universal	

== See also ==
- List of number-one dance singles of 2011 (U.S.)
