= Louboutins =

Louboutins may refer to:

- Christian Louboutin, a fashion designer most renowned for his self-titled footwear label
- "Louboutins" (song), a 2009 single by Jennifer Lopez
