= Fresh Out the Oven =

Song by Jennifer Lopez

Promotional single by Jennifer Lopez as Lola featuring Pitbull
- Released: October 7, 2009
- Genre: Electro-R&B
- Length: 3:35
- Label: Epic
- Songwriters: Amanda Ghost; Jennifer Lopez; Armando Perez; Pharrell Williams
- Producer: The Neptunes

Music video
- "Fresh Out The Oven" on YouTube

"Fresh Out the Oven" is a song recorded by American singer Jennifer Lopez, featuring American rapper Pitbull. The mid-tempo electro-R&B song was written by Amanda Ghost, Lopez, Pitbull and Pharrell Williams, while production was handled by The Neptunes. Ghost brought the song to Lopez, who although loved it, didn't think it matched the sound of the music she had been recording at the time. Lopez eventually decided to record the song and release it as a promotional single in anticipation of her seventh studio album Love? (2011). The song premiered online on October 7, 2009, and was promoted to clubs in the United States by Epic Records.

An accompanying music video for "Fresh Out the Oven" was directed by Jonas Akerlund, which features the use of repetitious images for a hypnotic effect and avoids showing any of the actors' faces until the final act. "Fresh Out the Oven" received generally positive reviews from music critics. The song managed to reach number one on the U.S. Dance Club Chart.

== Background ==
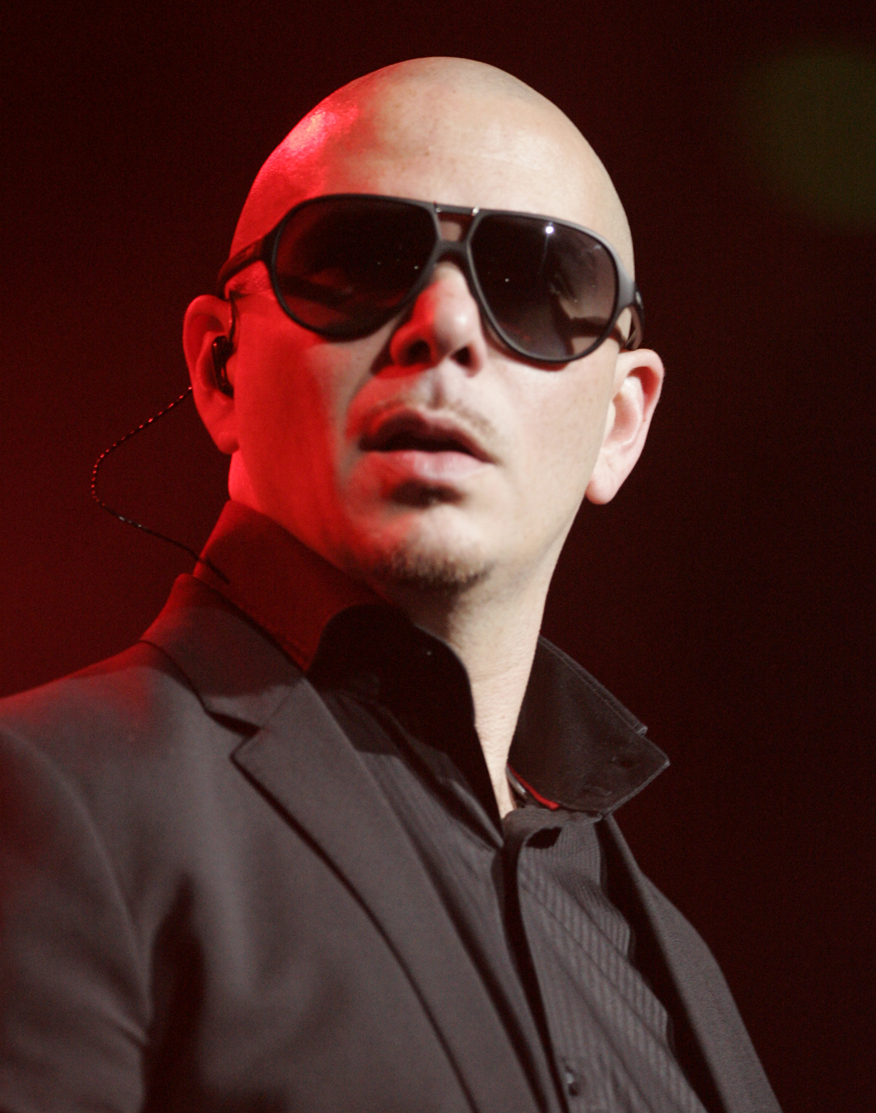
Pitbull's appearance on "Fresh Out the Oven" led the two to work together on several other recordings, such as "On the Floor", "Dance Again" and "Live It Up".

Following the commercial and critical failure of her sixth studio album Brave (2007)—and while pregnant with twins Max and Emme—Lopez began working on new music for a future project in 2008. The project was kept under wraps until February 2009 when a new song from the recording sessions titled "Hooked on You" leaked online. Lopez addressed the leak on her official website in May 2009, stating that "I'm always excited about my music and this ["Hooked on You"] is one of a few tracks I'm currently working on. I'm flattered by everyone's interest in the track and really excited for you to hear the real thing..." Following the leak of "Hooked on You", "One Love" and "What Is Love?" (later re-titled "(What Is) Love?") were subsequently leaked online in May. The leaked songs were, at the time, meant to appear on a greatest hits album; that later turned into a studio album. In June 2009, Lopez told MTV's Larry Carol that the songs hinted at the musical direction of her then-upcoming seventh studio album. She also stated that she was keen to finish the album and several singles, with a potential release date for the end of 2009.

On the red carpet of the 2009 MTV Video Music Awards on September 13, 2009, Pitbull revealed that he had recorded a new track with Lopez that would be released as the first single from her then-upcoming seventh studio album. The song's title, initially announced by Pitbull as "Lola", was later revealed to be called "Fresh Out the Oven". Despite Pitbull announcing the song to be the first single from Lopez's seventh studio album, it was later announced that the song would only serve as a buzz single and would not appear on her album. The song made its premiere on October 7 via People.com.

== Music and lyrics ==
"Fresh Out the Oven" (2009)
A sample of the chorus to "Fresh Out the Oven", a mid-tempo electro-R&B song.

"Fresh Out the Oven" is a mid-tempo electro-R&B song, with a length of three minutes and thirty-five seconds (3:35). The song was co-written by Lopez, along with Amanda Ghost, Pitbull and Pharrell Williams, who produced the song with his production team The Neptunes. Lopez opens the first verse of the song by the lines: "Now don't tell me that you love me to get with this / You say you stay forever / But it don't make sense". According to Tamar Anitai of MTV Buzzworthy, the song is a throwback "to her dancehall / dance-chart days" and a reminder that "she'll always be that Fly Girl". An editor from website Código Venezuela named the song "a theme that blends hip hop with electronic sounds, leaving a sensual interpretation by Lopez while her partner makes its peculiar mixture of Spanish with English". In an interview in March 2010, Lopez said about the song: "The head of my record company, Amanda, really loved this record. She said, 'This record is for Jennifer Lopez. We've got to get this record to Jennifer Lopez'. She let me hear it and I said, 'You know what? I love the record, but it doesn't fit in with the album I'm making. And she said, I don't care. You just have to record this record. I don't care if you put another name on it. And so we did and we put it out and it went to No.1".

== Reception ==
=== Critical response ===
Nick Levine from Digital Spy said of the song when it first appeared online, "Truth be told, the track's a pretty standard sexy electro-R&B jam, but the Lola persona is reasonably intriguing, even if it does have a hint of the Sasha Fierce to it. It's very much a case of wait and see what happens next, we suppose." Elena Gorgan of Softpedia made similar comments. saying that "Of course, there is little substance to the lyrics of 'Fresh Out the Oven' but, critics say, substance is perhaps the last thing Lopez needs right now if she wants to regain her well-deserved first position in the charts, especially in the light of her latest not too brilliant releases. As far as the song is concerned, it’s written to make the listener want to get to the dancefloor and move to the beat, they say. Because of this, if accompanied by a good video with awesome choreography – the kind Lopez knows how to do so well – and enough promotion, this could turn into a massive hit on all fronts."

DJ Booth said of the song: "I give you Jennifer Lopez (or Lola, as she now wants to be called). Coming off an extended wedding/pregnancy hiatus from the music community, Lola is now toting sexy around like an expensive fashion accessory. For her welcome-back single, Lola joins forces with fellow Latino Pitbull over a typically synth-driven Pharrell beat to show the world that even though she’s years removed from the peak of her career, she’s still 'Fresh out the Oven'." Ryan Brockington of the New York Post gave a positive review of the song, saying it has a "tight, sassy, radio friendly sound". He continued by stating that: "The track's surprising hottness could be because she not only tapped Pitbull to appear but she also had hit-makers the Neptunes produce the puppy".

=== Commercial performance ===
The song charted in mid-November 2009, but went unnoticed until the week of December 12, 2009, when the song shot up the U.S. Hot Dance Club Songs to number 14. After nine weeks, it reached a new peak of number two. In its tenth week on the chart, it reached number one making it Lopez's third consecutive number one (seventh overall) dance hit following in the footsteps of 2007's "Do It Well" and 2008's "Hold It Don't Drop It". In its eleventh week, the song fell down the chart to number ten. In its twelfth week the song fell another two places to number 12, whilst in its thirteenth week on the chart it fell another three places to 15, with further descents in the subsequent weeks. According to Billboard the song failed to chart on any of the U.S. airplay charts. "Fresh Out the Oven" finished in tenth place on the Billboard Hot Dance Club Songs year-end chart of 2010.

== Promotion ==
In October 2009, a Twitter account, MySpace page and teaser website, all in the name of Lola, were set up. They all featured a dancing female figure named Lola. Rumors surfaced that Lopez had adopted Lola, as her alter-ego, however, this was confirmed as false by the president of Epic Records, Amanda Ghost. She said: "It's something fun. She hasn't become Sasha Fierce (Beyoncé Knowles' artistic alter ego). There won't be anything to do with Lola on her Love? album. This is a hot club record that the label loved and Jennifer thought was fun, Jennifer and Pitbull got together and the record leaked. Lola is a fun character just for this song".

Lopez was in attendance at the LIV Nightclub in Miami on October 24, 2009, where the music video for "Fresh Out the Oven" was previewed. The video premiered on Lopez's official website on November 20, 2009. The clip was directed by Jonas Akerlund and according to Lopez's official website its formally titled: "Fresh Out the Oven" starring Jennifer Lopez as Lola & featuring Pitbull. The unrated director's cut was uploaded on director Jonas Akerlund’s official website in January 2010. The video makes use of repetitious images for a hypnotic effect, and avoids showing any of the actors' faces until the final act. This focus on bodies in sexual positions led to comparisons with Stanley Kubrick's Eyes Wide Shut. Focus on Style commented on Lopez's costumes and fashion during the video. According to the online magazine's style guide Lopez chose an Agent Provocateur leapard skin bodysuit. It is similar in style to Lopez's younger contemporaries Katy Perry, Christina Aguilera, Daisy Lowe, Lily Allen, Scarlett Johansson though when Lopez wears it "baby its muy caliente!"

== Charts ==
=== Weekly charts ===
Chart (2010)	Peak position
Global Dance Tracks (Billboard)	15
Russia (Tophit Weekly General Airplay)	103
U.S. Billboard Hot Dance Club Songs	1

=== Yearly charts ===
Chart (2010)	Peak position
U.S. Billboard Hot Dance Club Songs	10

== See also ==
- List of number-one dance singles of 2010 (U.S.)
