= Love? =

Studio album by Jennifer Lopez
- Released: April 29, 2011
- Recorded: 2010–2011
- Studios: Triangle Sound (Atlanta); Little Big Sound (Burbank); Al Burna (Davie); Et Al Indamix (Dominican Republic); Conway (Hollywood); Larrabee (Hollywood); Chalice (Los Angeles); Henson (Los Angeles); Pulse (Los Angeles); Record Plant (Los Angeles); Hit Factory Criteria (Miami); Cove City (New York); MSR (New York)
- Genres: Dance-pop; hip-hop; R&B
- Length: 46:58
- Label: Island
- Producers: BeatGeek; Mike Caren; D'Mile; Nate "Danja" Hills; Jimmy Joker; Lady Gaga; Terius "The-Dream" Nash; Oligee; Radio; RedOne; Stargate; C. "Tricky" Stewart

Jennifer Lopez chronology
| Brave (2007) | Love? (2011) | Dance Again... the Hits (2012) |

Singles from Love?
- 1. "On the Floor" Released: February 8, 2011; 2. "I'm Into You" Released: April 1, 2011; 3. "Papi" Released: August 10, 2011

Love? is the seventh studio album by American singer Jennifer Lopez. It was released on April 29, 2011, by Island Records. Produced during the pregnancy of her twins Emme and Max, Love? was cited by Lopez as her most personal album to date, taking inspiration from the birth of her twins and her own experiences with love.

Recording for the album began in 2009, with an original release date for the project set for January 2010 by Epic Records to coincide with Lopez's film The Back-up Plan. However following the lack of success with lead single "Louboutins", Lopez and Epic Records parted ways, leaving the fate of Love? in uncertainty. In 2010, Lopez signed a new record deal with Island Records, allowing proceedings for the release to be kept. The album includes a mixture of previously recorded material which leaked online in 2009 and 2010 during recording sessions, along with new songs with Tricky Stewart, The-Dream and RedOne commissioned by Island Records. Primarily a dance-pop record, Love? also marks a return to Lopez's pop/R&B roots.

Upon its release, Love? garnered mixed reviews from music critics. While some were critical of it, others disagreed, praising it as a great dance album. Commercially, Love? debuted at number five on the US Billboard 200 chart, becoming her sixth album to peak within the top 10 in the United States, and her highest peak since 2005's Rebirth. Internationally, Love? experienced moderate success, peaking within the top 10 in twenty-four different countries and also reaching the top five of several music markets. The album sold 353,000 copies in the United States.

The album's first single under Island Records is "On the Floor" and features Pitbull. It reached number three on the Billboard Hot 100, and topped over thirty international charts, while the second and third singles from Love?, being "I'm Into You" featuring rapper Lil Wayne and "Papi", both topped the Billboard Hot Dance Club Songs, each becoming moderate hits. Love? has become her third consecutive album to have all singles reach number one on that chart, earning her a milestone for eleven number ones at the time tying her with Katy Perry and Kristine W.

== Background ==
Love? follows the footsteps of her least commercially successful album, Brave (2007), which just missed the top ten of the US Billboard 200, at position 12. Its beginnings date from late 2007 and early 2008, during Lopez's pregnancy with twins Emme and Max. While pregnant, and while at home after pregnancy, Lopez had been working on new music for future projects. In February 2009, a new song from those recording sessions titled "Hooked on You" leaked online. Lopez would address the leak on her official website in May 2009, where she said "I'm always excited about my music and this ["Hooked on You"] is one of a few tracks I'm currently working on. I'm flattered by everyone's interest in the track and really excited for you to hear the real thing..." Songwriter Wynter Gordon also addressed another leak from the album, a song that Gordon wrote called "What Is Love". In a personal blog through her official MySpace page, Gordon expressed her discontent that an unfinished, unmastered version of "What Is Love" had been leaked through the Internet. "I wrote this song from a deep place in my heart. If the world was gonna hear it, I wanted them to hear it right... It's as good as gone to me now... The story was given a Lifetime TV special instead of a movie... sad." Gordon did note that she was dissatisfied with the circumstances but was in "no way dissing Lopez." The following month Lopez told MTV's Larry Carol that she was keen to finish the album and several singles, with a potential release date for the end of 2009.

In February 2010, Lopez left Sony Music Entertainment (and Epic Records) by mutual consent. Her departure from the label temporarily halted production on the album. However upon signing a new contract with Island Def Jam Music Group, recording resumed on the album, and Lopez entered the studio with Kuk Harrell to record brand new material for the disc. The New York Daily News revealed that Lopez would be taking some of the records recorded under Sony Music to her new label so that they could be included on the album. She said "stuff I'd been performing will be on the album as will previously released dance cuts." According to the paper, Island Def Jam would also release a remix disc alongside the album. AOL's music entertainment site, PopEater, later reported that Epic Records had actually shelved Love? and never committed to releasing the album, although this was never confirmed by Lopez, Epic or Island Def Jam. In February 2011, Lopez told BBC that the album was nearly complete. She had around twenty songs recorded from 2009–2011 which were being considered for the album, but she was finding it hard to edit the final track listing. "I'm very proud of the album; it's so hard to edit it because I have recorded maybe 20 songs and of course I'm not going to put 20 songs on an album, so to cut out eight to ten of those... it's breaking my heart." Lopez credits Love? as her best album to date because on it she recorded her "best vocals". RedOne and Lopez's new label boss, Antonio "L.A." Reid served as executive producers on the album.

== Recording and production ==
"I'm very proud of who I am as a vocalist from where I started... The voice was always there, I was just so insecure about it in the beginning. Marc [Anthony] helped me so much because he was the one who was like, 'You have a beautiful voice,' I think people are gonna be surprised with some of the vocals on this album. It [will have] urbanny-type tracks on it. Don't worry. Booty shakers, mid-tempos, feel-good [records]."

— Jennifer Lopez, speaking on the types of song that would appear on Love? and how she has grown as an artist.

While on set filming for The Back-up Plan in June 2009, Lopez revealed to MTV's Larry Carol that she had been working on the follow-up album to 2007's Brave. She had been working on the album during pregnancy, but it was not until the birth of her twins, Max and Emme, that she was able to focus on the project. Carol asked about the direction of the album, but Lopez refused to comment, instead saying "You can't help but put not only your kids into it, but to put anything you are going through in your music. [...] The only thing you can really sing or write is stuff that you know. The more music you make and the more that you get into it and the more you write, the more you realize that's all you can write." At the time of the interview, two of the album's songs had leaked. The first, titled "(What Is) Love?", was written by Wynter Gordon and co-written and produced by Emile Dernst II (D'Mile). After expressing dismay at the song's leak, its writer (Wynter Gordon) spoke of why the song was very personal to her: "[What Is Love is about] not knowing what love is ...I felt like so many woman have that same story. No fathers, families, abusive boyfriends and husbands..no parental support, they feel alone .. I've had my few relationships and have yet to feel love [sic]." Jean Baptist produced a 'part-two' for the song, which was mentioned at one of the album pre-release parties, attended by Rap-Up magazine, however the second part of the song was omitted from the track listing. The original version of the song, under the title "What Is Love", was included on the soundtrack to the 2010 film, The Back-up Plan, starring Lopez.

Gordon also wrote "Starting Over" for the album with help from Marcella Araica and Nathaniel Hills (Danja), who also produced the song. Over a "fast-paced, galloping beat", Lopez describes the hardships of "getting back in the game after a breakup". According to the album credits, this is the only song with credited live instruments. The third song written by Gordon is called "Everybody's Girl", co-written by Mike Caren, Shep Crawford and Ollie Goldstein. The lyrics in this song speak of whether the female protagonist's man can love her "under the intense glare of the spotlight", over an up-tempo production. The other, aforementioned leaked song, "One Love", was written by Lopez, Antea Birchett, Anesha Birchett and Dernst II, as a tribute to her past relationships. Lopez references her famous lovers from the past, Sean Combs ("Took a shot with the bad boy from the block"), backup dancer Cris Judd ("We danced until we said 'I do'"), Ben Affleck ("Came and swept me off my feet, went nowhere but kept the ring"), and Marc Anthony ("Number four, you sang to me, but I'm not sure ... Made me want to try once more and I couldn't say no").

The Birchett sisters also worked with Muhammed Kateeb and Otis Greyson to write the third leaked song, "Hooked on You". Danja also produced two other songs for the album, "Love and War" (also written by the Birchett sisters) and "Keeper". The latter bears some resemblance to T.I.'s "Hell of a Life" (2009) which was also produced by Danja. It also follows in the same vein as "One Love" with lyrics that focus on Lopez searching for and then finding Mr. Right. While "Starting Over" and "One Love" both made the album, Danja's other two productions did not. Meanwhile, Caren and Chris Sernal respectively produced and wrote the guitar-driven ballad "Beautiful", which according to Rap-Up, is resemblant of production work by Ryan Tedder. Lopez also worked with Pharrell Williams and his production outfit The Neptunes on the album. One record they produced, "Fresh Out the Oven" was written by Williams, Pitbull, Lopez and Amanda Ghost. It also features additional vocals from Pitbull, but was only ever intended to be a fun record that was leaked by Epic Records and promoted in US night clubs. Neither track made the final track listing.

However, not all of Lopez's collaborators were new. She reunited with longtime collaborator, Rodney Jerkins (Darkchild) who has worked with Lopez numerous times in the past. Darkchild produced "This Cannot Be Love", although the song did not make the final track listing for Love? It has similar introductory chords to "The Boy Is Mine" (1998) by Brandy Norwood and Monica. "This Cannot Be Love" has a progressive uptempo melody which continues to gather pace over the course of the song, while in the lyrics Lopez "asks if true love exists". When asked what inspired some of the album's records, Lopez told The Advocate, that whenever she records a new album she always thinks of dance music as it is popular in the gay community and club cultures. She said songs like "This Cannot Be Love"have musicality similar to her worldwide hit, "Waiting for Tonight" (1999), which was well received by the LGBT community. "[This Cannot Be Love] talks about the idea of getting lazy in love. You know how we do that? When you're with somebody and you're like: Wait a minute — remember when we were so in love and obsessed with each other? What happened?"

Lopez also worked with Norwegian producers, StarGate on a personal song called "Story of My Life", and the album's second single "I'm Into You". While the former does not feature on the album, the latter is an Island-flavoured mid-tempo song, co-written by Taio Cruz and featuring guest vocals from Lil Wayne. Other major producers on the album include Christopher "Tricky Stewart" and The-Dream, who produced the album's Epic Records lead single, "Louboutins". The song was initially produced and written by Stewart and The-Dream for Brandy Norwood, but following Norwood's departure from Epic Records it was subsequently given to Lopez. The song, backed with strong synths and trumpets "tells the story of a woman stuck in a dead-end relationship with a man who clearly doesn't deserve her, and with her journey to realizing that and eventually walking out on him", and her frustration that her man is not 100% committed. "Louboutins" topped the US Hot Dance Club Songs chart but did not garner any airplay. Furthermore, critics gave the song mixed reviews, calling the lyrical content "boring", "dated" and "poo", although some did appreciate that the song was "catchy" and had some club appeal to it. It was excluded from the final track listing. Other songs recorded with Stewart and The-Dream include "Run the World" which initially featured Rick Ross and The-Dream, but the final version of the song removed both featured artists. It was tipped by Lopez to be a potential summer single. Another song produced by the duo was "Good Hit", initially lined up as a buzz single. MTV's Chris Ryan described it as having a slick dance beat over which "Lopez sings about dropping it low in a voice coated with the much-maligned but incredibly popular vocal filter."

In November 2009, Stewart told Vibe that his and The-Dream's fellow production associate Kuk Harrell, would be producing a lot of the album. He said "I heard him working on some of the vocals and she has a lot of really good songs, I will say that. The stuff I heard was really good, really strong." Following Lopez's move to Island Def Jam, Lopez re-entered the studio to record new material with Harrell. Lopez later revealed that most of the album had been revamped and most production was now courtesy of Stewart and The-Dream despite recording several new songs with Moroccan producer RedOne, which made the album. Amongst those recorded with RedOne is the Latin music-influenced "On the Floor" which features Pitbull and a sample from Kaoma's 1989 hit single "Lambada". Two other RedOne songs, co-written and co-produced by Lady Gaga, "Invading My Mind" and "Hypnotico", also appear on Love? "Hypnotico" was originally recorded by recording artist Tami Chynn for her unreleased second album. Meanwhile, Lopez told fans in March 2011 that she recorded some of the album's songs in Spanish. Rap-Up revealed that the album was to also feature production from producer Troy "Radio" Johnson.

== Title, concept and cover ==
Lopez revealed to MTV that the album would have a very tight and focused concept. Although in initial interviews she refused to reveal the title or concept, she said the album was personal to her. "You can't help but put not only your kids into it, but to put anything you are going through in your music", she said. "[T]he only thing you can really sing or write is stuff that you know. The more music you make and the more that you get into it and the more you write, the more you realize that's all you can write." In October 2009, People magazine revealed that Lopez's album was going to be called Love?. She would tell KIIS FM's DJ Skee that she had chosen to call her album Love? because love was something that still confused her. "Love is the most confusing thing in the world, that's why the album is called Love with a question mark." Lopez told The Advocate's Brandon Voss that she also took into account the gay community and how they might feel towards the album. She said all her previous albums had a universal appeal and the LGBT community had played a part in the success of her music in the past, e.g. "Waiting for Tonight" (1999).

During interviews with one of her official fansites, Lopez also revealed that fans could expect a mixture of musical styles like her previous albums. "Expect pop records, R&B and a little hip hop." When Billboard previewed the album in January 2010, Ben-Yehuda Ayala said "Lopez sings, talk-sings and broods (within pop reason) on the subject of love," while Rap-Up said it is very much in keeping with the title, "a love roller coaster, taking you through the ups and downs of a relationship". Following her move to Island Def Jam, Lopez said she would still be pressing ahead with the album under the title Love?. "I just feel like it's an endlessly fascinating topic that all my albums have been about. It's still very confusing to me and so I explore that on this album, probably more than my other albums." She also revealed that her husband Marc Anthony initially disapproved of the title because he felt that it may imply that the couple were having marital problems. However in interviews with DJ Skee, she said "love has always been a theme of my career and this record wasn't going to be different. The album has a lot of up-tempo, dancy, urban tracks."

The album cover for Love? was revealed on Barbara Walters' 10 Most Fascinating People of 2010, which aired December 11, 2010. On the cover, Lopez is adorned with diamonds "and a fur coat as she looks into the distance". Robbie Daw from Idolator joked that "from the look of things, it seems as if Miss Lopez's hair is having a close encounter of the third kind on the cover. Or maybe that's just her natural glow when she's up in the morning making flapjacks for the kids?" The deluxe edition, which features sixteen tracks as opposed to twelve on the standard edition, features the same cover as the standard edition except the background and text is tinged blue instead of pink.

== Release and label change ==
In July 2009, a spokesperson for Lopez told People magazine that Lopez was not replacing Paula Abdul on the ninth season of American Idol because she would be busy promoting her film, The Back-up Plan as well as her new album. Both projects were slated for a January 2010 release, despite Lopez previously stating that she was aiming for the end of 2009. However during an interview with KTU Mornings, Lopez revealed that both the album and film were being pushed back to April 2010. Rap-Up magazine would later confirm that the album and film were being released together in cross-promotion of each other. However this date appeared unlikely when, backstage at the 52nd Grammy Awards ceremony, she said "I'm working on my album that will be out... hopefully this year, we'll see if I get it done... You know how it is, you go in your there non-stop, you leave it alone for a minute and you come back – you're like, okay, this is what I need."

On February 22, 2010, it was announced that Lopez had parted ways with Epic Records, leaving the fate of the album in jeopardy. The initial press release from Lopez's manager Benny Medina said: "Jennifer had a wonderful relationship with the Sony Music Group, and they have shared many successes together, but the time was right to make a change that best serves the direction of her career as an actress and recording artist, she is grateful and appreciative to everyone at Sony for all that they accomplished together". That same day, Lopez's representative confirmed the news to Entertainment Weekly and revealed that Lopez was negotiating a deal with several other labels. Lopez herself confirmed the split and announced that she had found a new label and that the album would be released in the summer of 2010, "I have fulfilled my contractual responsibilities with Sony/Epic up to this point, and we have both reached friendly terms about my departure from the label. I'm also happy to say that we've found a new home for my album, 'Love,' and that it is slated for release in the summer of 2010." Billboard magazine would later go on to confirm that Lopez had signed to Def Jam Records and that the album was now due in Summer 2011. According to Rap-Up magazine, the album was to be released on March 29, 2011. Just several weeks after the first announcement, Rap-Up announced that the album had been pushed back to April 19, 2011. No reason was given for the new date. This conflicted with comments made by Lopez during an online chat with her fans. On March 13, 2011, Lopez said that the album was most likely to come out at the end of May 2011 after at least one more single had been released. A final release date of May 3, 2011, in the United States was later confirmed.

== Promotion ==
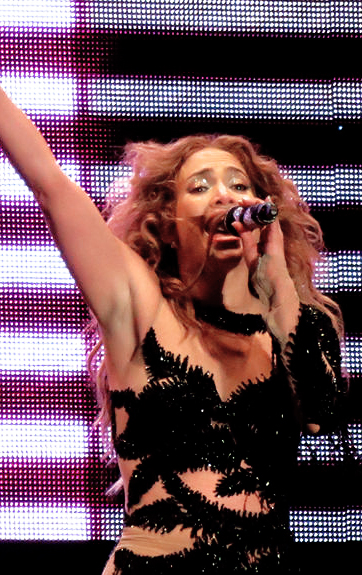
Lopez performing "On the Floor" on her Dance Again World Tour in 2012

The promotional campaign for Love? began with the song "Fresh Out the Oven" featuring Pitbull. The song was leaked by Epic Records in 2009, and promoted to US nightclubs as a "fun record". It would go on to top the US Dance/Club Play Songs chart. In November 2009, Lopez premiered the album's lead single, "Louboutins" at the 2009 American Music Awards. The performance gained notoriety for an unchoreographed fall in the middle of the dance routine. Lopez was praised for her swift recovery and continuation of the performance. Lopez reprised the performance on The Ellen DeGeneres Show on December 3, 2009, where she also laughed and joked about the incident. She was also booked to perform on the season six finale of So You Think You Can Dance on December 16, 2009. The performance took on a holiday theme and was choreographed by the show's team. Her final performance of the year came on December 31, 2009, where Lopez performed "Louboutins" along with a medley of her previous hits "Waiting for Tonight" and "Let's Get Loud" at Dick Clark's New Year's Rockin' Eve with Ryan Seacrest. Lopez's choice of outfit, a shimmering skin-tight cat-suit, received attention from the media with the New York Daily News praising her for her "flawless physique".

On January 18, 2010, on the talk show Lopez Tonight, Lopez appeared in place of George Lopez and opened the show with a ten-minute comedy set. George Lopez appeared after she finished to continue with the show and announced that Jennifer would be back in several weeks with a live band to perform. On February 19, 2010, Lopez performed at the 60th annual Sanremo Music Festival in Sanremo, Italy. She performed a medley of her chart-topping hits, as well as "(What Is) Love?", introducing it as the lead single from the soundtrack of her then-upcoming movie The Back-up Plan. On February 27, 2010, Lopez performed and hosted an episode of Saturday Night Live. She performed two new songs: "Pieces" and "Starting Over", although it was later confirmed that the first song Lopez performed was actually called "Until It Beats No More", and not "Pieces" as reported.

On January 16, 2011, a trailer for a new promotional single, "Good Hit", was released. In the video Lopez assumes the role of a teacher to lead a classroom of beauty school students. It was directed by Alex Moors back in October 2010, back to back with another song called "Take Care". It is Love?'s second promotional single after "Fresh Out the Oven" with Pitbull (2009). The debut of the album's first official single, "On the Floor" with Pitbull, was timed to coincide with the premier of Lopez's L'Oréal hair commercial during the 68th Golden Globe Awards ceremony and her debut as a full-time judge on season ten of American Idol. Several more promotional singles preceded the album's release, which were all exclusively released through the iTunes Store. On March 22, 2011, the Spanish version of "On the Floor", titled "Ven a Bailar", was released followed by "I'm Into You" on April 2, "Papi" on April 17 and "(What Is) Love?" on April 23, 2011. "I'm Into You" was subsequently confirmed as the album's official second single. "Papi" debuted in Finland at number nine, Spain at number eighteen, Canada at number sixty-five and the US at number ninety-nine.

== Singles ==
On December 21, 2009, when the album was due for release under Epic Records, a song titled "Louboutins" was released as Love?'s first single. Despite being promoted with several live performances, the song was declared a commercial failure after failing to garner US airplay, although it did top the Hot Dance Club Songs chart. It was one of the contributing factors to Lopez leaving Epic Records. The album's first single under Island Records is "On the Floor". The uptempo dance song features rapper Pitbull along with a sample of Kaoma's 1989 hit single "Lambada", and elements of house and Latin music. It was sent to mainstream radio on February 8, 2011, and was first released for digital download as a remix EP on February 11. The standard version was released on February 18. The song was well received by critics who compared it to Lopez's 1999 debut single "If You Had My Love", and her millennium hit single "Waiting for Tonight". It is the first single from Love? to receive recognition on the US Billboard charts, after the Epic Records' buzz single, "Fresh Out the Oven" (also featuring Pitbull), and previous lead single, "Louboutins", both failed to receive any airplay. The single reached the top five in most countries around the world, including reaching number one in eighteen countries. In the UK, it reached number one, giving Lopez her third number one single in the UK and first since 2005's "Get Right".

During an online chat with fans in March 2011, Lopez revealed that she was considering releasing "I'm Into You", featuring her favorite male rapper, Lil Wayne, as the album's next single. The song was released in many countries on April 1, 2011. "I'm Into You" was also used in a promotional campaign in the US and Canada on Lopez's official Facebook page. If enough fans "liked" the song, then it would be unlocked for early purchase on the iTunes Store. On April 1, the song was released to iTunes, four days earlier than planned for those markets. A music video for the single began production on April 2, 2011. The video aired on NBC's The Today Show on May 2, 2011.

"Papi" was released as the third single It impacted U.S. Top 40/Mainstream and Rhythmic radio on September 27, 2011 and was released in the UK on October 31, 2011.

== Critical reception ==
Professional ratings
Aggregate scores
| Source | Rating |
|---|---|
| AnyDecentMusic? | 4.6/10 |
| Metacritic | 46/100 |
Review scores
| Source | Rating |
| AllMusic | 2/5 stars |
| The A.V. Club | C− |
| Club Fonograma | 32/100 |
| Digital Spy | 3/5 stars |
| Entertainment Weekly | C |
| Los Angeles Times | 1.5/4 stars |
| The Observer | 3/5 stars |
| Rolling Stone | 2/5 stars |
| Slant Magazine | 3/5 stars |
| USA Today | 2/4 stars |

Love? received mixed reviews from critics. At Metacritic, which assigns a normalised rating out of 100 to reviews from mainstream critics, the album received an average score of 46, based on nine reviews, which indicates "mixed or average reviews". Stephen Thomas Erlewine, editor at the music website AllMusic, gave a mixed review for the album, commenting that "Lopez was never, ever about singing" and referring to the album as "high-sheen wallpaper, so flimsy that it peels away immediately after application". Adam Markovitz from Entertainment Weekly commented that "despite the star power she emits on screen, her vocals have always been less than stellar" and that she "often sounds limited and nasal, with a flatness that can feel downright Rebecca Black-esque at its worst." However, Ian Drew from US Magazine awarded the album three out of five stars, praising Lopez for returning "to her dance-diva-from-the-block roots". In his review, Drew concluded that "all in all, when it comes to her day job, J. Lo is solidly still in business." Sal Cinquemani of Slant Magazine gave the album three out of five stars, saying that: "Love? isn't the all-out dance album it could—and should—have been." Cinquemani also saw that: "the album's urban-leaning midtempo tracks feel oddly dated, like leftovers from an album recorded in a pre-Gaga world."

Hermione Hoby from The Observer gave the album a mixed review, saying that Lopez "ends her four-year recording hiatus with a load of turbo-produced bangers". However, Hoby was not impressed with the lyrics, commenting that they let the album down. "The only thing impeding dancefloor abandon is the hilarity of the record's lyrics." Alex Macpherson from BBC Music gave a favorable review for the album. He said that Lopez "possesses both a lightness of touch and the effortless confidence of one of nature's own divas, which means that whenever she hits the floor to essay up-tempo swagger tracks she convinces without being as overbearing." MacPherson also felt that "Love? seeks to showcase her vulnerability and depth of feeling." The Los Angeles Times was critical of the album, rating it one-and-a-half out of four stars, and referring to it as "a limp, personality-free dance-pop collection with plenty of A-list collaborations (Tricky Stewart, RedOne, Lady Gaga) but none of the lightweight charm she once brought in hits like 'Waiting for Tonight' and 'Jenny from the Block'." Jody Rosen from Rolling Stone rated it two stars out of five and said that: "Love? arrives with shiny production credits, but it's undone by J.Lo's slight voice and slighter personality." Robert Copsey from the entertainment website Digital Spy gave a more favorable review for the album, rating it three stars and stating that: "As a comeback album, Love? does the job perfectly – hauling an almost-forgotten Lopez back into chart relevance with a collection of calculated, safe and bang-on-trend tunes that were constructed for radio and clubs alike." At USA Today, Elysa Gardner rated it two stars out of four, writing that the release "suffers from such a lack of personality". Pop Crush was more positive with its track by track review pointing "I'm Into You", "Run The World", "Until It Beats No More" and "Hypnotico" as standout tracks.

== Commercial performance ==
Love? debuted at number five on the US Billboard 200 chart, selling 83,100 copies in its first week. In its second week, the album dropped to number nine, selling 33,000 copies. In its third week, the album dropped to number 18, selling 18,000 copies. In the fourth week, the album slipped only one slot to number 19 with 16,000 copies. The following week, it fell to number 38, selling 12,000 copies. In its first month of sales, Love? sold 138,400 copies. As of July 2020, Love? had sold 353,000 copies in the US.

Elsewhere, Love? performed decently. The album debuted at number 11 on the Australian ARIA Albums Chart, becoming her highest debut since 2005's Rebirth, which peaked at number 10. Later, the album jumped to number nine, becoming her highest peaking album on the Australian charts since 2001's J.Lo. The album spent eight weeks on the charts, her longest since 2002's This Is Me... Then. In New Zealand, the album debuted at number 19, becoming her best debut since her 2002's remix compilation J to tha L–O! The Remixes. In its third week, the album peaked at number 12, her highest since J to tha L-O!, which peaked at number three.

In some Europeans nations, the album performed moderately well. In Switzerland, the album performed very well and peaked at number one, becoming her fourth album to do so. It was later certified gold for selling more than 15,000 copies. In Spain, the album peaked at number three, becoming her best since 2007's Como Ama una Mujer. In France, the album debuted and peaked at number seven, becoming her best effort on the French charts since Rebirth, remaining for 24 weeks on the charts, her longest since This Is Me... Then and her fourth album to reaching the top ten. In the United Kingdom, Love? debuted and peaked at number six, her best album on the UK charts since J to tha L–O!. In July 2013, the album was certified gold in the country for completing shipments of 100,000 units.

== Track listing ==
Love? – Standard edition
| No. | Title | Writer(s) | Producer(s) | Length |
|---|---|---|---|---|
| 1. | "On the Floor" (featuring Pitbull) | RedOne; Kinda Hamid; AJ Junior; Teddy Sky; Bilal "The Chef"; Armando Perez; Gonzalo Hermosa; Ulises Hermosa | RedOne; Kuk Harrell^{[a]} | 4:44 |
| 2. | "Good Hit" | Terius "The-Dream" Nash; C. "Tricky" Stewart | Stewart; Nash; Harrell^{[a]} | 4:04 |
| 3. | "I'm Into You" (featuring Lil Wayne) | Taio Cruz; Mikkel S. Eriksen; Tor Erik Hermansen; Dwayne Carter | StarGate; Harrell^{[a]} | 3:20 |
| 4. | "(What Is) Love?" | Diana Gordon; Dernst Emile II | D'Mile; Harrell^{[a]} | 4:26 |
| 5. | "Run the World" | Nash; Stewart | Stewart; Nash; Harrell^{[a]} | 3:55 |
| 6. | "Papi" | RedOne; AJ Junior; BeatGeek; Sky; Bilal "The Chef"; Jimmy Joker | RedOne; BeatGeek; Joker; Harrell^{[a]} | 3:43 |
| 7. | "Until It Beats No More" | Troy Johnson; Evan Bogart; Jörgen Elofsson | Radio; Harrell^{[a]} | 3:52 |
| 8. | "One Love" | Jennifer Lopez; Anesha Birchett; Antea Shelton; Dernst Emile II | D'Mile; Harrell^{[a]} | 3:54 |
| 9. | "Invading My Mind" | RedOne; AJ Junior; BeatGeek; Sky; Bilal "The Chef"; Joker | RedOne; Lady Gaga; BeatGeek; Joker; Harrell^{[a]} | 3:20 |
| 10. | "Villain" | Nash; Stewart | Stewart; Nash; Harrell^{[a]} | 4:03 |
| 11. | "Starting Over" | Gordon; Nathaniel Hills; Marcella Araica | Danja; Harrell^{[a]} | 4:02 |
| 12. | "Hypnotico" (bonus track) | RedOne; Lady Gaga; Aliaune Thiam; Claude Kelly; Tami Chynn | Joker; Harrell^{[a]} | 3:35 |
| Total length: | | | | 46:58 |

Love? – Deluxe edition bonus tracks
| No. | Title | Writer(s) | Producer(s) | Length |
|---|---|---|---|---|
| 13. | "Everybody's Girl" | Mike Caren; Oliver Goldstein; Gordon; Shep Crawford | Caren; Oligee; Harrell^{[a]} | 3:28 |
| 14. | "Charge Me Up" | RedOne; AJ Junior; BeatGeek; Sky; Joker | RedOne; BeatGeek; Joker; Harrell^{[a]} | 3:59 |
| 15. | "Take Care" | Stewart; Ester Dean; Makeba Riddick; Robyn Fenty; Hermansen; Eriksen; Robert Thompson; Eldra DeBarge; William DeBarge; Etterlene Jordan | Stewart; Harrell^{[a]} | 2:57 |
| 16. | "On the Floor (Ven a Bailar)" (featuring Pitbull) | RedOne; Hamid; AJ Junior; Sky; Bilal "The Chef"; Perez; G. Hermosa; U. Hermosa; Julio Reyes Copello; Jimena Romero | RedOne; Harrell^{[a]} | 4:52 |
| Total length: | | | | 62:14 |

Notes

- ^{^a} signifies a vocal producer
- "On the Floor" and "On the Floor (Ven a Bailar)" contain an interpolation of "Llorando Se Fue", written by Gonzalo Hermosa and Ulises Hermosa.
- "Take Care" contains:
  - interpolation and sample of "Rude Boy", written by Ester Dean, Makeba Riddick, Robyn Fenty, Mikkel S. Eriksen, Tor Erik Hermansen, and Robert Thompson.
  - elements of "I Like It", written by Eldra DeBarge, William DeBarge, and Etterlene Jordan.

== Personnel ==
- Adapted from album booklet.

=== Performance ===
- David Angell on "Starting Over"
- Monisa Angell – viola on "Starting Over"
- Anesha Birchett – background vocals on "(What Is) Love?", "Run the World" and "One Love"
- John Catchings – cello on "Starting Over"
- Tami Chynn – additional vocals on "Hypnotico"
- David Davidson – violin
- Alli Davis – background vocals on "Good Hit"
- Lauren Evans – background vocals on "Run the World" and "Villain"
- Alessandro Giulini – accordion
- Dianna "Wynter" Gordon – background vocals on "(What Is) Love?" and "Starting Over"
- Kuk Harrell – background vocals on "On the Floor" and "Run the World"
- Jack Jezioro – String Bass on "Starting Over"
- Anthony LaMarchina – cello on "Starting Over"
- Jennifer Lopez – primary artist
- Terius "The-Dream" Nash – background vocals on "Run the World"
- Jeanette Olsson – background vocals on "I'm Into You"
- Geraldo "Teddy Sky" Sandell – background vocals on "Invading My Mind" and "Charge Me Up"
- Pamela Sixfin – violin on "Starting Over"
- Kristin Wilkinson – viola on "Starting Over"
- Karen Winkelmann – violin on "Starting Over"

=== Technical ===
- Jim Annunziato – engineer, vocal engineer, vocal recording
- Marcella "Ms. Lago" Araica – engineer, mixing
- Nick Banns – assistant engineer
- Beatgeek – programming, producer, instrumentation
- Tim Blacksmith – management
- Anesha Birchett – vocal producer
- Al Burna – vocal engineer
- Michael "Banger" Cadahia – engineer, vocal recording
- Dustin Capulong – assistant engineer
- Danny D. – management
- David Davidson – string arrangements
- Steven Dennis – assistant engineer
- Mike "Handz" Donaldson – mixing
- Dernst Emile II (D'Mile) – producer, engineer
- Eric Eylands – recording assistant
- Stefani "Lady Gaga" Germanotta – producer
- Chris Galland – assistant engineer
- Elizabeth Gallardo – assistant recording engineer
- Jesus Garnica – assistant mastering engineer
- Gene Grimaldi – mastering
- Josh Gudwin – vocal recording, vocal engineering
- Kuk Harrell – vocal arrangements, vocal engineer, vocal producer, vocal editing
- Nathaniel Hills (Danja) – producer
- Ghazi Hourani – recording assistant
- Jimmy Joker – programming, producer, instrumentation
- Jaycen Joshua – mixing
- Doug Joswick – package production
- John "J-Banga" Kercy – additional Pro-Tools
- Nadir "RedOne" Khayat – producer, vocal arranger, vocal editor, vocal producer, instruments and programming, recording engineer, executive producer
- Damien Lewis – engineer, assistant mixing engineer, additional mixing
- Erik Madrid – mixing
- Manny Marroquin – mixing
- Troy "R8DIO" Johnson – producer
- Benny Medina – executive producer
- Trevor Muzzy – audio mixer, recording engineer
- Terius "The-Dream" Nash – producer
- Chris "Tek" O'Ryan – engineer, vocal editing
- Julian Peploe – art direction
- Bobby Shin – engineer (strings)
- Chris Soper – assistant engineer
- StarGate (Tor Erik Hermansen & Mikkel Storleer Erikssen) – producer, instruments, engineer, recording engineer
- Christopher "Tricky" Stewart – producer
- Phil Tan – mixing
- Brian "B-Luv" Thomas – engineer
- Pat Thrall – engineer
- Miles Walker – engineer
- Andrew Wuepper – engineer

=== Art, design and photography ===
- Doug Joswick – package production
- Julian Peploe Studio – art direction, design
- Deborah Mannis-Gardner – sample clearance
- Martina Nilsson – styling
- Mary Phillips – make-up
- Juan Carlos Maci Ques – hair
- JP Robinson – art direction, design
- Warwick Saint – photography
- Gabriela Schwartz – marketing
- Kristen Yiengst – photography coordination

== Charts ==
=== Weekly charts ===
| Chart (2011) | Peak position |
|---|---|
| Australian Albums (ARIA) | 9 |
| Australian Urban Albums (ARIA) | 2 |
| Austrian Albums (Ö3 Austria) | 7 |
| Belgian Albums (Ultratop Flanders) | 18 |
| Belgian Albums (Ultratop Wallonia) | 18 |
| Canadian Albums (Billboard) | 2 |
| Croatian International Albums (HDU) | 2 |
| Czech Albums (ČNS IFPI) | 1 |
| Dutch Albums (Album Top 100) | 18 |
| Finnish Albums (Suomen virallinen lista) | 5 |
| French Albums (SNEP) | 7 |
| German Albums (Offizielle Top 100) | 4 |
| Greek Albums (IFPI) | 3 |
| Hungarian Albums (MAHASZ) | 13 |
| Irish Albums (IRMA) | 7 |
| Italian Albums (FIMI) | 6 |
| Japanese Albums (Oricon) | 9 |
| Mexican Albums (Top 100 Mexico) | 5 |
| New Zealand Albums (RMNZ) | 12 |
| Norwegian Albums (VG-lista) | 6 |
| Polish Albums (ZPAV) | 13 |
| Portuguese Albums (AFP) | 11 |
| Russian Albums (2М) | 4 |
| Scottish Albums (Official Charts) | 6 |
| Slovenian Albums (IFPI) | 6 |
| South African Albums (RiSA) | 13 |
| South Korean International Albums (Circle) | 18 |
| Spanish Albums (Promusicae) | 3 |
| Swedish Albums (Sverigetopplistan) | 14 |
| Swiss Albums (Schweizer Hitparade) | 1 |
| UK Albums (Official Charts) | 6 |
| UK R&B Albums (Official Charts) | 2 |
| Uruguayan Albums (CUD) | 8 |
| US Billboard 200 | 5 |
| Venezuelan Albums (Recordland) | 4 |

=== Year-end charts ===
| Chart (2011) | Position |
|---|---|
| Australian Urban Albums (ARIA) | 27 |
| Canadian Albums (Billboard) | 32 |
| French Albums (SNEP) | 93 |
| German Albums (Offizielle Top 100) | 94 |
| Italian Albums (FIMI) | 54 |
| Mexican Albums (AMPROFON) | 66 |
| Russian Albums (2M) | 33 |
| Spanish Albums (PROMUSICAE) | 50 |
| Swiss Albums (Schweizer Hitparade) | 31 |
| UK Albums (OCC) | 113 |
| UK R&B Albums (OCC) | 20 |
| US Billboard 200 | 119 |
| Worldwide Albums (IFPI) | 39 |

== Certifications and sales ==
| Region | Certification | Certified units/sales |
|---|---|---|
| Canada (Music Canada) | Platinum | 80,000^{^} |
| France | — | 40,000 |
| GCC (IFPI Middle East) | Gold | 3,000^{*} |
| Germany (BVMI) | Gold | 100,000^{^} |
| Italy (FIMI) | Gold | 30,000^{*} |
| New Zealand (RMNZ) | Platinum | 15,000^{‡} |
| Poland (ZPAV) | Platinum | 20,000^{*} |
| Portugal (AFP) | Platinum | 20,000^{^} |
| Russia (NFPF) | Gold | 5,000^{*} |
| Singapore (RIAS) | Platinum | 10,000^{*} |
| Switzerland (IFPI Switzerland) | Gold | 15,000^{^} |
| Taiwan | — | 15,000 |
| United Kingdom (BPI) | Gold | 100,000^{*} |
| United States | — | 353,000 |
Summaries
| Worldwide | — | 2,000,000 |
^{*} Sales figures based on certification alone.^{^} Shipments figures based on certification alone.^{‡} Sales+streaming figures based on certification alone.

== Release history ==
| Region | Date | Format | Label | Edition(s) | Catalog |
|---|---|---|---|---|---|
| Australia | April 29, 2011 | CD, digital download | Universal Music | Standard, deluxe edition | 2753434 |
| Germany | April 29, 2011 | CD, digital download | Universal Music | | 0602527534343 |
| Ireland | April 29, 2011 | CD, digital download | Universal Music | | |
| Brazil | April 29, 2011 | Digital download | Universal Music | Deluxe edition | |
| France | May 2, 2011 | CD, digital download | Universal Music | | |
| United Kingdom | May 2, 2011 | CD, digital download | Mercury | Standard, deluxe edition | |
| Canada | May 3, 2011 | CD, digital download | Universal Music | | |
| Mexico | May 3, 2011 | CD, digital download | Universal Music | Standard, deluxe edition | 602527534343 |
| United States | May 3, 2011 | CD, digital download | Island & Nuyorican | Standard, deluxe edition | 602527534343 |
| Brazil | May 3, 2011 | CD | Universal Music | Standard | 602527534343 |
| Denmark | May 4, 2011 | CD, digital download | Universal Music | | |
| United States | May 10, 2011 | CD | Island & Nuyorican Productions | Glitterati edition | |
| Japan | May 18, 2011 | CD, digital download | Universal Music Japan | | UICL1111 |

== See also ==
- List of number-one hits of 2011 (Switzerland)
