= I'm Into You =

2011 single by Jennifer Lopez

Single by Jennifer Lopez featuring Lil Wayne

from the album Love?
- Released: April 1, 2011
- Recorded: 2010
- Studio: Roc the Mic, New York; Westlake, Los Angeles
- Genre: Pop; R&B
- Length: 3:20 (album); 3:54 (single)
- Label: Island
- Songwriters: Taio Cruz; Mikkel S. Eriksen; Tor Erik Hermansen; Dwayne Carter
- Producers: Stargate; Kuk Harrell

Jennifer Lopez singles chronology
"On the Floor" (2011)	"I'm Into You" (2011)	"Papi" (2011)

Lil Wayne singles chronology
"Someone to Love Me (Naked)" (2011)	"I'm Into You" (2011)	"Motivation" (2011)

Music video
- "I'm Into You" on YouTube

"I'm Into You" is a song recorded by American singer Jennifer Lopez for her seventh studio album Love? (2011). It features American rapper Lil Wayne, who also co-wrote it alongside British singer-songwriter Taio Cruz and Norwegian musicians Mikkel S. Eriksen and Tor Erik Hermansen. The latter two also produced the song, credited as Stargate. A mid-tempo pop and R&B song, it depicts Lopez about being lost in love, while Lil Wayne's verses interject clever wordplay. The song was originally due for release as a promotional single in the US and Canada on April 5, 2011, but was unlocked and released in those markets four days earlier on April 1, 2011, through a campaign on Lopez's Facebook page. The song was later serviced to rhythmic and urban radio on April 26, 2011, as the second single from Love?.

"I'm Into You" received generally positive reviews from contemporary music critics, who complimented the song's catchy hook, island-flavored production and playful lyrics. The song reached number one in Greece and Lebanon, number 41 on the US Billboard Hot 100, topped the Billboard Hot Dance Club Songs chart, and reached the top ten on the UK Singles Chart. The music video for "I'm Into You" began production in Chichen Itza, Mexico on April 2, 2011, and was released on May 2, 2011, at Today. The video depicts the singer on a Mayan pyramid, as well as on a beach with her love interest; she also dances with two other dancers. The video received critical acclaim, praising her dance skill and beauty.

== Background ==
Lopez released "Louboutins", a song written and produced by The-Dream and Tricky Stewart, as the first single from Love? in November 2009. However, upon release, the song failed to garner enough airplay to chart, despite topping the US Billboard Hot Dance Club Songs chart. Lopez subsequently left Epic Records in February 2010, citing that she had fulfilled her contractual obligations and now wished to release Love? under a new label. Her departure from the label temporarily halted production on the album; however, after she signed a new contract with Island Records, recording resumed on the album. The New York Daily News revealed that Lopez would be taking some of the records recorded under Sony Music Entertainment to her new label so that they could be included on the album. Lopez released her first single with the label "On the Floor" featuring American rapper Pitbull in February 2011. The song topped the charts across the globe, peaking at number three on the US Billboard Hot 100 and becoming her highest-peaking song on that chart in over eight years, and would go on to become one of the most successful singles of the year; it was also well received by critics, who compared it to her 1999 singles "If You Had My Love" and "Waiting for Tonight". During an online chat with fans in March 2011, Lopez revealed that she was considering releasing "I'm Into You", featuring her favorite male rapper Lil Wayne, as the album's second single.

On March 30, 2011, Lopez appeared on Ryan Seacrest's morning radio show On Air with Ryan Seacrest to discuss the upcoming release of her seventh studio album Love? and her American Idol experiences. She also introduced a thirty-second preview of her new single "I'm Into You". Later that same day, the full song was leaked online. The song was used in a promotional campaign in North America on Lopez's Facebook page. If enough fans "liked" the song, it would be "unlocked" for early purchase on the iTunes Store. On April 1, the song was released to the iTunes Store in North America, four days earlier than planned in those markets. The song was then sent to rhythmic and urban airplay in the United States on April 26, 2011, as the second single from Love?. "I'm Into You" was solicited to contemporary hit radio stations in the United States on June 12, 2011.

== Music and lyrics ==
"I'm Into You"
A twenty-second sample of "I'm Into You", which features Lopez singing over a midtempo Island-flavored pop beat.

"I'm Into You" is a midtempo pop and R&B song, with a length of three minutes and twenty seconds (3:20). The song was written by Taio Cruz, Lil Wayne and Stargate (Mikkel S. Eriksen and Tor Erik Hermansen), who also produced the song. The song features a guest rap from Lil Wayne, who Lopez cited as being her favorite male rapper at the time. Lopez's vocals for the song were recorded and produced by Kuk Harrell, with additional recording from Jim Annunziato, Josh Gudwin and Chris "TEK" O'Ryan at Roc the Mic Studios in New York City and Westlake Recording in Los Angeles. Lil Wayne's rap was recorded by Mike "Banger" Cadahia, with assistance from Elizabeth Gallardo. Eriksen handled audio engineering of "I'm Into You", alongside Miles Walker with additional engineering from Damien Lewis. The song was later mixed by Phil Tan with the assistance of Lewis at Ninja Club Studios in Atlanta, Georgia.

"I'm Into You" is built around a "trippy" and "synth-heavy beat" and "beachy feel" with a "club-ready refrain," according to Mary Kinney from AOL Music. Kinney commented about Lil Wayne's verses, describing lines like "I'm falling for you, baby / I need a parachute" as clever wordplay. According to Rap-Up, on the song, Lopez "finds herself lost in love" and her lover's attraction. The song's "lithesome beat" is pitched "somewhere between Puerto Rican reggaeton and Jamaican dancehall". "I'm Into You" is built around a "na-na-na" hook, that has received similarities to Rihanna's "What's My Name?". "I'm Into You" is a "Jamaica-meets-Latin late-night summer jam that is both bang-on-trend and worryingly infectious. The result is the Pina Colada of pop songs - smooth, fruity and beautifully presented...but with a surprising amount of kick." "I'm Into You" follows the "pop blueprint"; "layering sparkling synths over sharply bouncing, island tinged percussion" and a "dance floor friendly bass line".

== Critical reception ==
"I'm Into You" received positive reviews. Mary Kinney of AOL Music praised the song's "unstoppable production", stating that: "The hook of Lopez repeating 'I'm into you' will be ringing in listeners' ears long after the song is over, and Lil Wayne provides clever wordplay... The club-ready refrain challenges the listener to not sing along. This song is bound for greatness". Bradley Wete from Entertainment Weekly agreed, further commenting that Lopez is at "her perfect pitch. Her notoriously thin voice never strains–which is great for critical ears." Scott Shetler of PopCrush called the song one of the standout tracks on Love?, possessing "one of the most memorable and infectious hooks on the record". Jody Rosen of Rolling Stone said that although the song "should be a hot summer single", the song's lyrics are "painfully insipid, and the bland singsong tune fails to work its way into your mind's ear." He concluded by stating that: "Even Weezy, sounding as irrepressible as ever, can't coax any pep out of the desultory J. Lo". Sal Cinquemani of Slant Magazine praised the song, calling it a "summer-hit-in-the-making" with a "sexy island vibe and the kind of 'na-na-na' hook Rihanna has built an entire career around". Poppy Reid of The Music Network criticized the song for its reliance on autotune and lyrics "you just don't expect (or want) from a 41-year-old".

== Chart performance ==
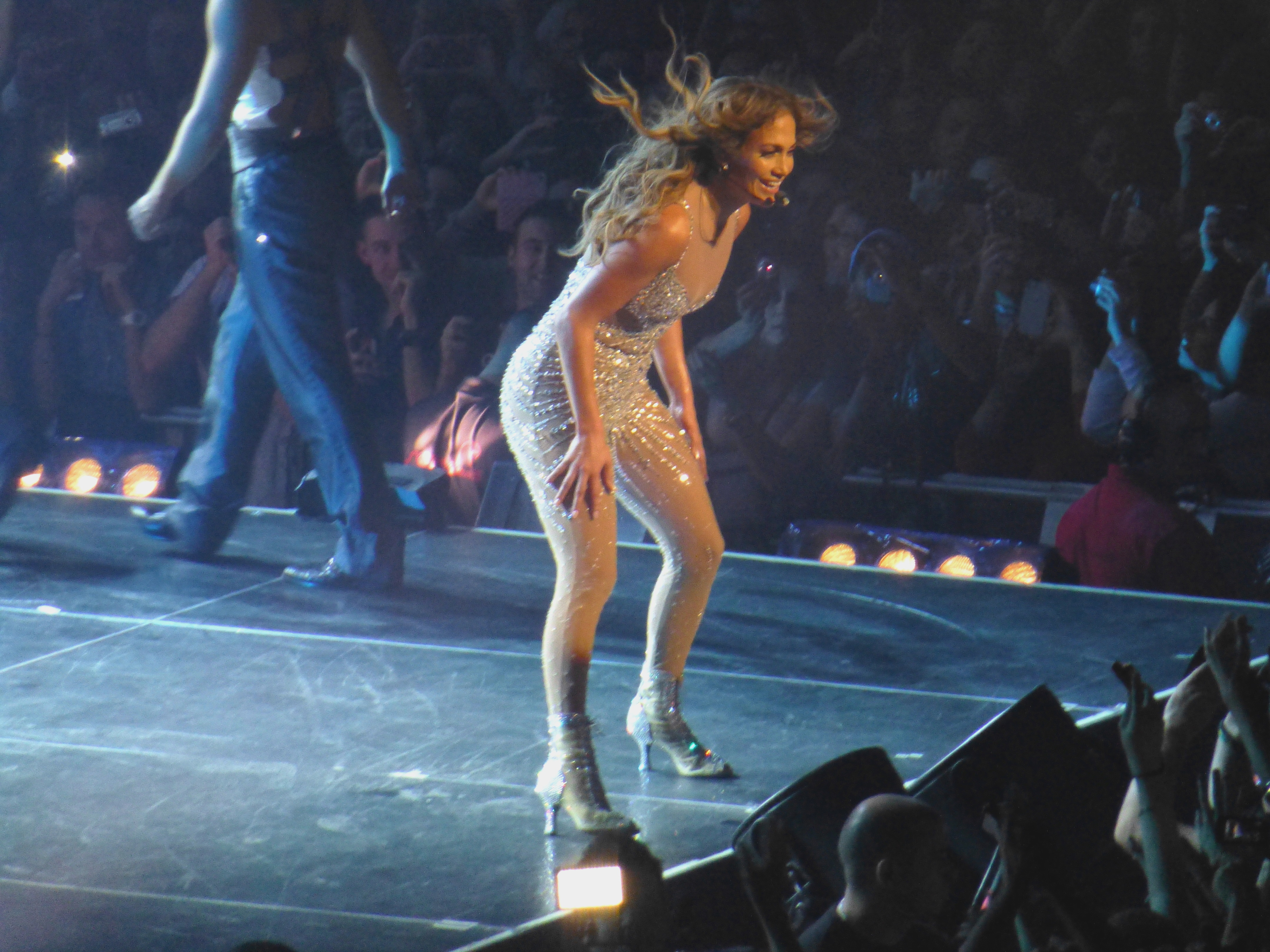
Lopez performing "I'm Into You" on her 2012 Dance Again World Tour

"I'm Into You" debuted at number 72 on the US Billboard Hot 100 chart for the issue dated May 21, 2011. It eventually reached a peak of 41 on August 21, 2011, and stayed on the chart for total of 13 weeks. Thus it became Lopez's sixteenth top-forty song on the chart. "I'm Into You" debuted at number 36 on the US Pop Songs chart for the issue dated July 9, 2011. The next week the single jumped to number 31 and eventually reached its peak of 19 on August 12, 2011. "I'm Into You" entered the US Hot Dance Club Songs chart at number 31 for the issue dated June 4, 2011. The next week it rose to number 19 and eventually topped the chart for the issue dated July 23, 2011; the single stayed on the chart for total of 11 weeks. "I'm Into You" was certified gold by the Recording Industry Association of America (RIAA) for selling more than 500,000 digital copies. The song entered the Canadian Hot 100 chart at number 61 on April 23, 2011, but the next week it fell off the chart. On May 21, 2011, it re-entered the chart at number 79 and eventually reached a peak of 55. It was certified gold by Music Canada after 40,000 downloads of the song were sold.

In Australia, "I'm Into You" debuted at number 47 on the singles chart. The next week the song reached its peak of 45 and stayed on the chart for total of four weeks. It was more successful in South Korea where it reached number six on the International Gaon Chart with sales of 28,539 digital copies for the week. In Europe, "I'm Into You" reached the top-ten in nine countries. The single debuted at number 40 on the UK Singles Chart on May 14, 2011. After five weeks on the chart it reached its peak at number nine on June 18, 2011. "I'm Into You" became Lopez fifteenth top-ten single in the UK. It also charted on the UK R&B Chart where it reached a peak of three. The song debuted at number 47 in Switzerland on May 22, 2011. After five weeks on the chart it reached a peak of 22 and was certified gold by International Federation of the Phonographic Industry (IFPI) - Switzerland for selling over 15,000 digital copies. It was more successful in Norway, where it debuted at its peak of nine and stayed on the chart for total of three weeks. In Italy "I'm Into You" peaked at number 14 and was certified gold by Federation of the Italian Music Industry (FIMI) after 15,000 digital copies of the song were sold. Also, the song reached the top twenty in several others countries including Finland, Germany Scotland and Spain, top thirty in Belgium, Ireland and Netherlands then top forty in France and Denmark.

== Music video ==
=== Background ===
The music video for "I'm Into You" was directed by Melina Matsoukas. Lopez shot the video's main scenes in Chichen Itza, Mexico, in early April 2011. Additional scenes with Lil Wayne were shot on April 21 in Los Angeles. Throughout its production, Lopez shared multiple photos from the video shoot with her fans through social networking website Twitter. US Weekly reported that scenes were filmed at different locations around a Mayan archaeological site. During one of the scenes shot at night, the ancient columns were lit for Lopez to dance around. At its three-minute mark, the video switches to a dance-breakdown to the song "Papi" where Lopez is backed by two female dancers. Rap-Up released two images from the shoot, and wrote: "A tatted Weezy leaned his back against People's Most Beautiful Woman in the World in the first images from the set." Telenovela star and model William Levy was cast as Lopez's love interest for the video. Lopez explained to Extra how she found the Cuban actor: "I called my cousins and I said 'Who's the hottest guy right now?' and they're like William Levy! And I was like, 'Okay, let's get William Levy!"

The video aired on NBC's Today on May 2, 2011. Although Lil Wayne was pictured filming scenes with Lopez, on green-screen, in Los Angeles, he does not appear in the version of the video premiered on Today. A version featuring the rapper was uploaded to Lopez's official Vevo on May 9, 2011. It is nearly identical to the first version, but features additional scenes where Lil Wayne appears alone against a dimly lit yellow backdrop.

=== Synopsis ===
Lopez in the music video for "I'm Into You", seen on the steps of a Mayan pyramid, dressed in a snakeskin outfit

The music video begins with Lopez looking radiant as she frolics on the beach with her telenovela male co-star William Levy. Wearing a bejeweled dress, Lopez sings alongside her co-star in a flash of color and black-and-white shots. The clip features the seductive singer atop the historical steps of the Chichen Itza. In one scene, Lopez is sat on the steps of Kukulkán's pyramid, dressed in a snakeskin outfit with a headwrap, matching bangles, and platform wedge heels. Along with the song's midtempo beat, "I'm Into You" also features an unexpected dance breakdown, where Lopez bursts into some swift choreography to a clip of her song "Papi". Another version of the video was later released, intercut with scenes featuring Lil' Wayne. Lopez is seen flaunting her body around ancient Mesopotamian Ziggurats.

=== Reception ===
Robert Copsey from Digital Spy gave a positive review for the video, enjoying the beach part, which according to him, is "reminiscent of her 'Love Don't Cost a Thing' video" and praising the dance breakdown, which included, according to him, "a wonderfully choreographed breakdown moment", featuring new album track 'Papi'. Dennis Pastorizo of the website Terra USA was impressed with the video, saying that: "Jennifer Lopez looks smokin' hot-heck-I dare to say, better than ever in the video." Ann Lee from the UK website Metro said that: "watching Jennifer Lopez's video for I'm Into You is like going on a summer holiday." She also thought that "Lopez tries her best to be as sexy as possible." Becky Bain of the website Idolator was also positive, saying that: "it's the perfect vid to welcome the Summer season." Eliot Glazer from MTV Buzzworthy positively said that: "Ms. Lopez still looks just as good! It's like she's aging in reverse." Erika Ramirez wrote for Billboard that "Lopez roll around white sand with her on-screen Latin beau and rock a short dance number. J.Lo's still got it! (Never doubted it.)"

== Live performances ==
Lopez was initially set to perform "I'm Into You" for the first time during an episode of American Idol on May 5, 2011, but didn't end up following through with it. In June, Lopez was the headlining act for the 2011 Summertime Ball at Wembley Stadium for a crowd of 75,000; "I'm Into You" was included on her setlist. Lopez performed "I'm Into You" during her appearance on the British chat show Alan Carr: Chatty Man on June 17, 2011. The song subsequently rose to number nine on the UK Singles Chart as a result of her performance. The song was included on the setlist for her Dance Again World Tour, which ran from June to December 2012. During the performance, Lil Wayne's parts of the song appeared in a clip which was displayed on the big screen.

== Track listing ==
Digital download – single

1. "I'm Into You" (feat. Lil Wayne) – 3:54

Digital download – "I'm Into You" Remixes

1. "I'm Into You" (Dave Audé Radio) – 3:54
2. "I'm Into You" (Low Sunday I'm Into You Radio) – 4:07
3. "I'm Into You" (Gregor Salto Hype Radio) – 3:20
4. "I'm Into You" (Dave Audé Club) – 7:01
5. "I'm Into You" (Low Sunday I'm Into You Club) – 6:25
6. "I'm Into You" (Gregor Salto Hype Club) – 5:10
7. "I'm Into You" (Dave Audé Dub) – 7:08
8. "I'm Into You" (Low Sunday I'm Into You Dub) – 6:25
9. "I'm Into You" (Gregor Salto Hype Dub) – 5:12

== Credits and personnel ==
Adapted from the album credits.

Personnel

- Jim Annunziato – vocal recording
- Mike "Banger" Cadahia – vocal recording (Lil Wayne's vocals)
- Dwayne Carter (Lil Wayne) – featured rap vocals, songwriter
- Taio Cruz – songwriter
- Mikkel S. Eriksen – songwriter, producer (alongside Hermansen, credited as Stargate), recording engineer, instruments
- Elizabeth Gallardo – assistant vocal recording (Lil Wayne's vocals)
- Josh Gudwin – vocal recording
- Jennifer Lopez – lead vocals
- Kuk Harrell – vocal producer, vocal recording, vocal editing
- Tor E. Hermansen – songwriter, producer (alongside Eriksen, credited as Stargate), instruments
- Damien Lewis – additional audio mixer, assistant engineer
- Chris "TEK" O'Ryan – vocal recording
- Jeanette Olsson – background vocals
- Phil Tan – audio mixer
- Miles Walker – recording engineer

== Charts ==
=== Weekly charts ===
Chart (2011–2012)	Peak position
Australia (ARIA)	45
Austria (Ö3 Austria Top 40)	10
Belgium (Ultratop 50 Flanders)	24
Belgium (Ultratop 50 Wallonia)	27
Brazil (Billboard Hot 100 Airplay)	7
Brazil (Billboard Hot Pop & Popular)	8
Canada (Canadian Hot 100)	55
Canada CHR/Top 40 (Billboard)	32
Canada Hot AC (Billboard)	40
CIS Airplay (TopHit)	74
Czech Republic Airplay (ČNS IFPI)	8
Denmark (Tracklisten)	39
Euro Digital Songs (Billboard)	13
Finland (Suomen virallinen lista)	19
France (SNEP)	38
Germany (GfK)	16
Global Dance Tracks (Billboard)	21
Greece (IFPI Greece)	1
Greece Digital Songs (Billboard)	9
Hungary (Editors' Choice Top 40)	20
Ireland (IRMA)	25
Italy (FIMI)	14
Lebanon (The Official Lebanese Top 20)	1
Netherlands (Dutch Top 40)	25
Netherlands (Single Top 100)	52
Norway (VG-lista)	9
Poland (ZPAV)	3
Poland (Dance Top 50)	4
Romania (UPFR)	6
Russia Airplay (TopHit)	91
Scottish Singles Sales (Official Charts)	14
Slovakia Airplay (ČNS IFPI)	7
South Korea (International Chart)	6
Spain (Promusicae)	17
Sweden (Sverigetopplistan)	54
Switzerland (Schweizer Hitparade)	22
UK Singles (Official Charts)	9
UK Hip Hop/R&B (Official Charts)	3
US Billboard Hot 100	41
US Hot Dance Club Songs (Billboard)	1
US Hot R&B/Hip-Hop Songs (Billboard)	79
US Mainstream Top 40 (Billboard)	19
US Hot Latin Songs (Billboard)	37
US Rhythmic Airplay (Billboard)	30

=== Year-end charts ===
Chart (2011)	Position
Belgium (Ultratop 50 Flanders)	92
Brazil (Crowley)	56
Germany (Media Control AG)	108
Greece (IFPI Greece)	52
Poland (ZPAV)	18
Romania (UPFR)	29
UK Singles Chart	86
US Hot Dance Club Songs (Billboard)	16

== Certifications ==
Region	Certification	Certified units/sales
Brazil (Pro-Música Brasil)	3× Platinum	180,000^{‡}
Canada (Music Canada)	Gold	40,000^{*}
Germany (BVMI)	Gold	150,000^{‡}
Italy (FIMI)	Gold	15,000^{*}
Switzerland (IFPI Switzerland)	Gold	15,000^{^}
United Kingdom (BPI)	Gold	400,000^{‡}
United States (RIAA)	Gold	500,000^{*}
^{*} Sales figures based on certification alone.^{^} Shipments figures based on certification alone.^{‡} Sales+streaming figures based on certification alone.

== Release history ==
Country	Date	Format	Label
France	April 1, 2011	Digital download	Universal
Germany	April 1, 2011	Digital download	Universal
United States	April 26, 2011	Rhythmic radio	Island
United States	April 26, 2011	Urban radio	Island
United States	May 23, 2011	Digital download (Remixes)	Island
United Kingdom	June 5, 2011	Impact day	Mercury
United States	June 12, 2011	Mainstream radio	Island

== See also ==
- List of number-one dance singles of 2011 (U.S.)
