= Anesha & Antea Birchett =

American singer-songwriters

Anesha Birchett-Moody & Antea Joy Birchett Shelton
- Also known as: APLUS
- Born: Detroit, Michigan, United States
- Genres: R&B; soul; gospel; hip-hop
- Occupation: Singer-songwriters

Anesha & Antea Birchett are American singer-songwriters, best known for their work with producers Rodney "Darkchild" Jerkins and D'Mile. Both sisters have written for Beyoncé, H.E.R., Ciara, Jennifer Lopez, and Justin Bieber, among others. Antea is currently an associate professor of Songwriting at Berklee College of Music.

== Songwriting and production credits ==
Credits are courtesy of Discogs, Tidal, Apple Music, and AllMusic.

| Title | Year | Artist | Album |
|---|---|---|---|
| "The Way I Love You" | 2006 | Tamia | Between Friends |
| "Hold Me Down" ‹› | 2006 | Danity Kane | Danity Kane |
| "Cry No More" «» | 2006 | Shareefa | Point of No Return |
| "Need a Boss" (Featuring Ludacris) «» | 2006 | Shareefa | Point of No Return |
| "Back Up" | 2007 | Beyoncé | B'Day |
| "Walking Miracle" | 2007 | Vanessa Bell Armstrong | Walking Miracle |
| "Fall In Love Again" | 2007 | Vanessa Bell Armstrong | Walking Miracle |
| "Watch Me" | 2007 | Vanessa Bell Armstrong | Walking Miracle |
| "Til The Victory's Won" | 2007 | Vanessa Bell Armstrong | Walking Miracle |
| "If I Had My Way" ‹› | 2007 | Bobby V | Special Occasion |
| "I Believe" «» | 2007 | Darlene McCoy | Darlene McCoy |
| "Make Me Sick" | 2008 | Danity Kane | Welcome to the Dollhouse |
| "Better Man" | 2008 | Noel Gourdin | After My Time |
| "Favorite Girl" | 2009 | Justin Bieber | My World (EP) |
| "In the Morning" | 2009 | Mary J. Blige | Stronger with Each Tear |
| "I'm On" | 2009 | Ciara | Fantasy Ride |
| "Boyfriend" (Featuring Michael Africk) | 2010 | Mai Kuraki | Future Kiss |
| "Blind" | 2011 | Mary Mary | Something Big |
| "One Love" | 2011 | Jennifer Lopez | Love? |
| "Hands On Me" | 2013 | Namie Amuro | Feel |
| "Thank You" | 2014 | Candice Glover | Music Speaks |
| "Sorry" | 2014 | Teyana Taylor | VII |
| "Request" | 2014 | Teyana Taylor | VII |
| "Introduction (Walk of My Life)" | 2015 | Koda Kumi | Walk of My Life |
| "Gone Away" | 2017 | H.E.R. | H.E.R. |
| "The Makings Of You" | 2017 | Tamar Braxton | Bluebird of Happiness |
| "White Noise" «» | 2018 | Traci Braxton | On Earth |
| "Don't You Worry" | 2018 | Star Cast | Star: Original Soundtrack From Season 2 |
| "Shotgun" | 2018 | Star Cast | Star: Original Soundtrack From Season 3 |
| "Only God Knows" | 2018 | Star Cast | Star: Original Soundtrack From Season 3 |
| "Come Back To Me" (Featuring Rick Ross & Junie) | 2020 | Teyana Taylor | The Album |
| "Diver" | 2020 | YooA | Bon Voyage (EP) |
| "Do It Again" «» | 2022 | CANDIACE | Deep Space (Deluxe) |
| "Insecure" (Featuring Trina) «» | 2022 | CANDIACE | Deep Space (Deluxe) |
| "Affirmations" «» | 2022 | CANDIACE | Deep Space (Deluxe) |
| "Win 2.0" (Featuring Isaac Carree) «» | 2022 | CANDIACE | Deep Space (Deluxe) |
| "Situationship" «» | 2022 | CANDIACE | Deep Space (Deluxe) |
| "Do It (Nostalgia)" «» | 2022 | CANDIACE | Deep Space (Deluxe) |
| "Drive Back" «» | 2022 | CANDIACE | Deep Space (Deluxe) |

«» (Anesha Birchett only)

‹› (Antea Birchett only)
