= Louboutins (song) =

Single by Jennifer Lopez
- Released: December 8, 2009
- Recorded: 2009
- Genre: R&B
- Length: 3:48
- Label: Epic
- Songwriters: Terius "The-Dream" Nash; C. "Tricky" Stewart
- Producers: C. "Tricky" Stewart; Terius "The-Dream" Nash; Kuk Harrell

Jennifer Lopez singles chronology
"This Boy's Fire" (2008)	"Louboutins" (2009)	"On the Floor" (2011)

"Louboutins" is a song recorded by American singer Jennifer Lopez. Written and produced by Terius "The-Dream" Nash and C. "Tricky" Stewart, the record was recorded by fellow recording artist and label-mate Brandy Norwood, but was given to Lopez following Norwood's departure from Epic Records. Lopez originally released the song as the lead single from her seventh studio album, Love?; however, after Lopez herself moved record labels to Island Records, the new lead single, "On the Floor", was released and "Louboutins" was not included on the album. The song uses the luxury footwear brand Louboutin as metaphor for female empowerment, with the lyrics focusing on women who need to leave their bad relationships with their heads held high.

Lopez premiered "Louboutins" at the American Music Awards on November 22, 2009, where she accidentally fell on her rear-end in the middle of the performance. Ryan Seacrest and will.i.am praised Lopez's showmanship and professionalism for swiftly recovering from the fall to continue the performance. It made its radio premiere a day later on KIIS-FM's On Air with Ryan Seacrest before being sent for radio adds on December 8, 2009.

"Louboutins" eventually topped the US Hot Dance Club Songs chart but failed to chart on the Billboard Hot 100 as it garnered little airplay. Subsequently in 2010, Lopez announced that her ten-year partnership with Sony Music was over, making the single her last release under Epic Records. A video for the single was never filmed and further promotion of the song was cancelled.

== Background ==
During an interview with Vibe magazine in November 2009, Tricky Stewart revealed that he was working on records for Lopez's upcoming album. He then revealed that he and The-Dream had originally produced "Louboutins" for R&B singer Brandy Norwood. She recorded the song after her 2008 album, Human. Norwood released a statement in which she admitted that the song was once hers: "It is true I had a song called 'Louboutins' that I loved and still love to pieces, but God never blesses you with another person's blessing". Stewart later revealed that when Norwood lost her deal, the song was left over and neither he nor The-Dream wanted the record to "die". "Louboutins" was subsequently offered to Lopez, who fell in love with the song. Christian Louboutin said he was "flattered" that Lopez had recorded a song about his shoe designs and was grateful that she had asked if she was pronouncing the name correctly.

== Writing and composition ==
"Louboutins" (2009)
A sample of the chorus where Lopez repeatedly sings the line "I'm throwing on my Louboutins", atop the musical production of two different keyboards and drum machines.

"Louboutins" is a R&B song which "tells the story of a woman stuck in a dead-end relationship with a man who clearly does not deserve her, and with her journey to realizing that and eventually walking out on him", and her frustration that her man is not 100% committed. The introduction was said to be similar to "4 Minutes" by Madonna and Justin Timberlake, though the melody is "backed with trumpets and synth beats". A reviewer from Prefix said that the record did not sound like a typical Tricky Stewart and The-Dream production.

Stewart told Vibe how he and The-Dream came up with the song's concept. He said "That was Dream and I just getting in the room and clicking,... We were both on two different keyboards, two different drum machines and once again just got behind the mic and the rest is history." Lyrics include lines like, "But it's the last time, I'm movin' on / I'm throwing on my Louboutins." Lopez described the idea behind the song as "that point in a bad relationship and you're like, 'Damn, I really have to leave. It's just not good for me,' ... It's not the girl who's like, 'I'm gonna take my stuff, and I'm gonna put on my sweatpants, and I'm gonna cry,'... This girl is like putting on her hottest dress and her sexiest Louboutin shoes, and leaving your ass". In the chorus Lopez sings "I'm throwing on my Louboutins" eight times and overall the word "Louboutins" is spoken thirty-two times across the song. Prefix magazine said that "Louboutins" is used as a metaphor for female empowerment.

== Critical reception ==
"Louboutins" received mixed reception from critics. Elana Gorgan of Softpedia focused on the single cover and concept of the song. She said "While the idea of the track is original, critics and fans alike say, the artwork is lackluster at best... There is a certain old vibe to the cover, what with the font of the writing and the shot in itself, but it's not helping the singer in any way garner much interest in the release." Leah Greenblatt of Entertainment Weekly said "[Louboutins] does for the ultra high-end shoe brand what Crocs do for sexy." She pointed out how the song was not as good as Lopez's previous material and at one point even called the song "Poo". Further to this, Peter Gicas of E! Online was also critical of the song, suggesting that the song leaked online before its official debut to warn fans of what Lopez was about to inflict on them. "The track begins with the singer insisting, "I'm taking back my love." Personally, we wish we could take back the last three minutes and 49 seconds." Tom Stacks of Entertainment Weekly was less than impressed saying "J. Lo needs to move on from her recording career. She had some fun, catchy songs ('If You Had My Love,' 'Love Don't Cost a Thing'), but trying to regain musical relevance by singing about pricey high-heels just seems a little sad. I say focus on getting the movie career back on track..."

Nick Levine from Digital Spy described the track as "a Tricky and The-Dream-produced club banger with a chorus that succeeds through sheer attrition, with a proper Janet Jackson-style dance break. ... Truth be told, it's not a J.Lo classic to rival 'Play' or 'Love Don't Cost a Thing', and it's about as original as starting your day with a bowl of Kellogg's Cornflakes, but it does burrow into your brain after a few spins."

== Live performances ==
MTV was first to name Lopez as one of the many performers to take to the stage at the 2009 American Music Awards. which aired on November 22, 2009. She later confirmed this on a KIIS-FM interview with DJ SKEE, saying that the performance would debut her new single, "Louboutins". The performance took on a boxing theme, and featured famous ring announcer Michael Buffer introducing Lopez to the stage. Lopez performed in a boxing-like outfit and had a costume change halfway through the performance. The performance began in the ring and ended with Lopez walking through the audience. However the performance did not go as planned when the choreographed stunt of climbing a human pyramid of male dancers went wrong and she lost her balance. In E! Online's "Top Five Worst Concert Diggers", Lopez's fall was ranked at number five. Ryan Seacrest called it "the greatest recovery ever!" According to MTV, "the tumble was edited out of the West Coast feed of the show, out of respect for Lopez, by the show's producers". After the incident will.i.am praised Lopez for being a true entertainer. "That shows she's a true entertainer and devoted, She came out of it and still rocked it. It doesn't matter how you fall – just how you get up. She got up."

Lopez reprised the performance on The Ellen DeGeneres Show on December 3, 2009 where she also laughed and joked about the incident. She also performed on the season six-finale of So You Think You Can Dance on December 16, 2009. The performance took on a holiday theme and was choreographed by the show's team. Lopez's final performance of the song came on December 31, 2009 where she performed "Louboutins" along with a medley of previous hits including "Waiting For Tonight" and "Let's Get Loud" at Dick Clark's New Year's Rockin' Eve with Ryan Seacrest. Lopez's choice of outfit, a shimmering skin-tight catsuit, received attention from the media with the NY Daily News praising her for her "flawless physique".

== Music video ==
Christian Louboutin said that he would dedicate his time to creating some "scene-stealing designs for the single's video", out of his appreciation for the song. According to Rap-Up, Lopez was scheduled to film the music video for the song in January 2010. She outlined the concept of the video in a radio interview, where she said: "It's gonna be a lot of dancing, I definitely want to do some dancing because it's been a while and I want to do a dance video, and it's going to be really empowering. It's going to be about that woman, you know when you have that moment when you realize you have to really get out of here that's the moment we're trying to cauterize in the video. Even when you know that it's gonna hurt later, you feel good about making the decision, so you're like "I decided! I'm walking up out the house right now" and that's the part we're gonna do in the video except I'm gonna dance my way out the house."

Not long after the interview, Lopez announced her departure from Epic Records in 2010 for a new record deal.

== Chart performance ==
"Louboutins" was to be the second consecutive song from Lopez's seventh album, Love?, to top the Hot Dance Club Songs chart following "Fresh Out the Oven", however, neither of the songs were included on the album's final track listing. According to Billboard, "Louboutins" failed to attain enough airplay to enter the Billboard charts. Later in 2010, the New York Daily News suggested that this lack of success played a role in Lopez's departure from Epic Records and Sony Music in earlier in the year.

== Charts ==
Chart (2010)	Peak position
Global Dance Tracks (Billboard)	25
US Dance Club Songs (Billboard)	1

== Release history ==
Region	Date	Format	Label
United States	December 8, 2009	Mainstream airplay	Epic

== See also ==
- List of number-one dance singles of 2010 (U.S.)
