= The Back-up Plan =

2010 film by Alan Poul

- Theatrical release poster
- Directed by: Alan Poul
- Screenplay by: Kate Angelo
- Produced by: Todd Black; Jason Blumenthal; Steve Tisch
- Starring: Jennifer Lopez; Alex O'Loughlin; Eric Christian Olsen; Anthony Anderson; Linda Lavin
- Cinematography: Xavier Pérez Grobet
- Edited by: Priscilla Nedd-Friendly
- Music by: Stephen Trask
- Production companies: CBS Films; Escape Artists
- Distributed by: CBS Films (United States); Sony Pictures Releasing International (International)
- Release date: April 23, 2010
- Running time: 104 minutes
- Country: United States
- Language: English
- Budget: $35 million
- Box office: $77.5 million

The Back-up Plan (previously known as Plan B) is a 2010 American romantic comedy film directed by Alan Poul, starring Jennifer Lopez, Alex O'Loughlin, Eric Christian Olsen, Anthony Anderson and Linda Lavin. The film follows a woman who aims to be a single mother through planned pregnancy, but soon falls in love with a man who wants to father her unborn children. It was released theatrically in the United States on April 23, 2010, by CBS Films. The Back-up Plan garnered negative reviews from critics, who praised Lopez's performance but criticized the generic script. It was a box-office success, grossing $77.5 million against a production budget of $35 million. This is Tom Bosley's last film before his death nearly six months after its release.

== Plot ==
Zoe gives up on finding the man of her dreams, decides to become a single mother and undergoes artificial insemination. The same day, she meets Stan when they both try to hail the same taxi. They run into each other twice more at a farmers market and a book signing. Stan convinces Zoe to go on a no-obligations date. Zoe is still uncertain whether she is pregnant or not and if she should tell Stan. The night she takes the test, Stan takes her for a romantic dinner in a garden. Things don't turn out as well as planned when he spills the wine and a fire occurs. At the end of the night Stan asks her to come to his farm during the weekend and Zoe finds out that she is pregnant.

She goes to the farm determined to tell him that she is pregnant. They sleep together and afterwards Stan is confused and angry that she didn't tell him before and Zoe leaves the next morning believing that things are over between them. However, Stan decides he still wants to be with her and they reconcile. They go to the doctor and find out that Zoe is actually carrying twins. Overwhelmed, Stan goes to a children's playing area to figure out what it means to be a father, but is suspected to be a pervert; this is soon cleared up. He finds a friend there that he can talk to about the pregnancy throughout the movie, while Zoe gets little support from her Single Mothers and Proud group when the group members discover she is no longer single. Stan takes the next step to becoming a father and orders an upgrade to the stroller for the twins. After many misunderstandings and comedic revelations, Zoe and Stan are walking into the Market when they run into Stan's ex-girlfriend. Due to Stan's remark that the twins are not his, Zoe believes that he is not ready to become a father to them, and breaks off the relationship.

Later, the stroller that Stan ordered arrives and Zoe figures out that Stan was never planning to leave. At her grandmother's wedding, Zoe's water breaks and on the way to the hospital they make a pit stop at the market. Zoe apologizes to Stan and they begin to work things out. He pulls out the penny that she turned over when they first met and Zoe promises to trust him more. Zoe gives birth to twin girls, one of whom they name Penny. In the end, Stan opens a store/restaurant next to Zoe's pet shop and after the Grand Opening speech Stan asks Zoe to marry him and she says yes. On their way home, she spontaneously throws up into a trash can and realizes that she may be yet again pregnant.

== Cast ==
- Jennifer Lopez as Zoe
- Alex O'Loughlin as Stan
- Michaela Watkins as Mona
- Melissa McCarthy as Carol
- Danneel Harris as Olivia
- Linda Lavin as Nana
- Eric Christian Olsen as Clive
- Anthony Anderson as Playground Dad
- Noureen DeWulf as Daphne
- Robert Klein as Dr. Harris
- Tom Bosley as Arthur
- Maribeth Monroe as Lori
- Peggy Miley as Shirley
- Jennifer Elise Cox as Babyland Salesgirl
- Adam Rose as Louie
- Cesar Millan as Himself

== Production ==
The film, originally titled Plan B, was written by Kate Angelo and produced by Todd Black, Jason Blumenthal and Steve Tisch. Lopez's casting was announced in December 2008 by multiple sources. Digital Spy announced in February 2009 that Alan Poul was in "final talks" to direct Plan B, which would be his first feature film. On April 8, 2009, The Arizona Republic reported that O'Loughlin was "in negotiations to nab the romantic male lead". The Back-up Plan was Lopez's first film in three years, and she confessed to feeling "really nervous". Filming began on May 11, 2009, in Los Angeles. The film's production budget was $35 million.

=== Music ===
The soundtrack and the score were released on March 26, 2010, on iTunes. They were made available on Amazon.com on April 13, 2010. The soundtrack has various artists, while the score was composed entirely by Stephen Trask.

=== Soundtrack ===
The Back-up Plan (Original Motion Picture Soundtrack)
No.	Title	Artist(s)	Length
1.	"What Is Love?"	Jennifer Lopez	4:27
2.	"Say Hey (I Love You)"	Michael Franti & Spearhead	3:39
3.	"Fallin' For You"	Colbie Caillat	3:36
4.	"Disco Lies"	Moby	3:32
5.	"A Beautiful Day"	India.Arie	3:51
6.	"Key to My Heart"	Jessica Jarrell	3:54
7.	"Crabbuckit"	K-os	3:40
8.	"Bottles"	V V Brown	3:02
9.	"You Me & the Bourgeoisie"	The Submarines	3:22
10.	"Let's Finish" (Sinden Remix)	Kudu	4:48
11.	"Daydream" (Titles Theme from The Back-up Plan)	Stephen Trask	2:25
12.	"She Drives Me Crazy" (bonus track)	Raney Shockne featuring Barbara Perry	3:14
13.	"What a Wonderful World" (bonus track)	Raney Shockne featuring Barbara Perry	2:36

=== Score ===
The film's score was composed by Stephen Trask.

1. Daydream – 2:25
2. The Back Up Plan – 1:05
3. Now What? – 1:04
4. That Guy – 0:43
5. Show Me Your Cheese – 0:24
6. Goodbye for Now – 0:22
7. Another Penny Drops – 1:28
8. Pregnancy Test – 1:31
9. Community Garden – 1:40
10. A Serious Question – 0:43
11. Fire – 0:40
12. First Kiss – 1:01
13. Test Results – 0:13
14. Shadybrook – 0:38
15. Mirror, Mirror – 1:02
16. Yummy, Yummy – 1:05
17. Cheese Muse – 1:15
1. Orgasm – 1:01
2. Telling the Truth – 1:46
3. Not Leaving Leaving – 0:33
4. Dejected – 0:24
5. Here We Go – 0:35
6. Studies – 0:19
7. Chicken In Your Hair – 0:39
8. Pancake Prelude – 0:28
9. Are You Still In There? – 2:56
10. Wall of Strollers / Examination – 1:48
11. Pictures of Mom – 1:32
12. Just Go – 2:40
13. I Wanted a Baby – 1:03
14. Old Dogs-New Tricks – 0:43
15. Baby Time – 0:43
16. And Now, for the Exciting Conclusion Of – 4:49
17. Proposal – 1:13

== Release ==
=== Box office ===
The Back-up Plan earned $4,257,676 in 3,280 theaters on its Friday debut, reaching number one at the box office. It dropped to number two at the weekend box office with a gross of $12,201,710, averaging $3,720 per theater. In its 2nd week it dropped to number four with $7,255,762, averaging $2,212 per theater. In its third week the film dropped to number five grossing $5,033,471, averaging $1,676 per theater. The following week it dropped to number six grossing $2,387,480, averaging $956 per theater. As of July 14, it had grossed $77,237,270 worldwide, and is CBS Films' highest-grossing film to date.

== Reception ==
The Back-Up Plan received a negative reception from critics, with most critics panning the script, but reacting positively to Lopez's performance. On the review aggregator website Rotten Tomatoes, 17% of 150 critics' reviews are positive, with an average rating of 3.7/10. The website's consensus reads: "Jennifer Lopez is as appealing as ever, but The Back-up Plan smothers its star with unrelatable characters and a predictable plot." Metacritic, which uses a weighted average, assigned the film a score of 34 out of 100, based on 32 critics, indicating "generally unfavorable" reviews.

Kirk Honeycutt of The Hollywood Reporter gave the film a positive review saying, "A winning performance by Jennifer Lopez overcomes a formulaic and predictable rom-com that involves a planned pregnancy." The New York Times film critic Manohla Dargis wrote that the film is "not very good" and "bland". Amy Biancolli of the San Francisco Chronicle praised the cast in her review writing "Lopez does a fine job mortifying herself in pursuit of physical humor, shifting her center of gravity in more ways than one. O'Loughlin, in the blander role, acts hurt or shocked or besotted where required, but the supporting players nearly steal the show." Chicago Sun-Times film critic Roger Ebert gave the film 1/4 stars, claiming the film "plays like an unendurable TV commercial about beautiful people with great lifestyles and not a thought in their empty little heads."

The Back-up Plan received two nominations for Best Romantic Comedy Actress (for Lopez) and Best Romantic Comedy at the 2010 Teen Choice Awards.

=== Home media ===
The Back-up Plan was released on DVD and Blu-ray on August 24, 2010, and sold 277,183 ($4.7 million) copies in its first week of release debuting at number two on the charts behind the sixth season of Lost.
