= (What Is) Love? =

2011 song by Jennifer Lopez

Promotional single by Jennifer Lopez

from the album Love?
- Released: April 22, 2011
- Recorded: 2009
- Studio: Conway Studios, Hollywood
- Genre: Electropop
- Length: 4:27
- Label: Island
- Songwriters: Diana Gordon; Dernst Emile II
- Producers: D'Mile; Kuk Harrell

Audio video
- "(What Is) Love?" on YouTube

"(What Is) Love?" is a song recorded by American entertainer Jennifer Lopez. Originally entitled "What Is Love?", the song appeared on the soundtrack to The Back-up Plan (2010), a film in which Lopez stars, and was presented in Italy at the Sanremo Music Festival 2010. The song was later included on Lopez's seventh studio album Love? (2011), as the album's title track. "(What Is) Love?" is a midtempo electropop song written by Diana "Wynter" Gordon, with the song's producer Emile "D'Mile" Dernst II. The song is about "not knowing what love is", according to Gordon. A remix of "(What Is) Love?", entitled "What Is Love? Part II", was produced by Jean-Baptiste. It was considered for inclusion on Love? and was leaked onto the internet in April 2013.

The song was due to be released as a promotional single from Love? on April 26, 2011, but was "unlocked" and released on April 22, 2011 by Island Records through a campaign on Lopez's Facebook page. Upon its promotional release, the song debuted at number 97 on the South Korea Gaon International Chart and at 33 on the Productores de Música de España.

== Writing and production ==
"(What Is) Love?" written by Diana "Wynter" Gordon and Emile "D'Mile" Dernst; the latter who also produced the song. Lopez's vocals for the song were recorded and produced by Kuk Harrell, with recording assistance from Jim Annunziato and Josh Gudwin at Conway Studios in Hollywood, California. Annunziato and Eric Eylands handled audio engineering of "(What Is) Love?", while the song was later mixed by Mike "Handz" Donaldson at Chalice Recording Studios in Los Angeles, California.

"(What Is) Love?" deals with the topic of "not knowing what love is". The song's co-writer Gordon stated that: "I felt like so many woman have that same story. No fathers, families, abusive boyfriends and husbands..no parental support, they feel alone .. I've had my few relationships and have yet to feel love [sic]."

== Leak and release ==
"(What Is) Love?"
A 24-second sample of "(What Is) Love?", a mid-tempo electropop song.

"What Is Love?" was leaked onto the internet in May 2009. Wynter Gordon, the co-writer of "What Is Love?", expressed her dismay at the "unfinished and unmastered" song's leak in a post on her official MySpace blog. She stated: "I wrote this song from a deep place in my heart. If the world was gonna hear it, I wanted them to hear it right... It's as good as gone to me now... The story was given a Lifetime TV special instead of a movie... sad." Gordon did note that she was dissatisfied with the circumstances, but was in "no way dissing Lopez."

A mastered version of "What Is Love?" was included on the soundtrack to The Back-up Plan (2010), a film in which Lopez stars. "What Is Love?" was re-titled as "(What Is) Love?" and appeared on Love? (2011). "(What Is) Love?" was due to be released as a promotional single from Love? on April 26, 2011, but was "unlocked" and released four days earlier, on April 22, 2011 by through a campaign on Lopez's Facebook page. It was released in many European countries on April 25.

== Critical response ==
The song received a positive review from Digital Spy's Robert Copsey, who although stating that it isn't any "we haven't heard before," Lopez carries "it off with her unrivalled glamour and effortless sophistication". He concluded by stating that the song was worthy of a standalone release. Monica Herrera from Billboard commented that on the song, Lopez channels "J.Lo circa 2003." Herrera added the song would have been "slayed if the gender had been flipped", and it had been sung by Justin Bieber. Joey Guerra from the Houston Chronicle said that Lopez uses "(What Is) Love?" (and the album cut "Starting Over") to play the jilted lover. Us Weekly noted the song's lyrics to be pointing "a few fingers" at Lopez's previous relationships, seen in the line dissing "blind dates" and the declaration of: "Musicians are the worst."

== "What Is Love? (Part II)" ==
During the first album listening party for Love? in 2009, Rap-Up magazine revealed that Jean-Baptiste had produced a second version of the song called "What Is Love? (Part II)". It was considered for included on the album but ultimately did not make the final track listing. It samples the "club-friendly" riff of Edwin Starr's 1970 single "War". "What Is Love? Part II" was leaked onto the internet on April 22, 2013.

== Credits and personnel ==
Credits adapted from the liner notes of Love?.

- Jim Annunziato – audio engineer, vocal recording engineer
- Anesha Birchett – background vocals
- Mike "Handz" Donaldson – mixing engineer
- Emile Dernst II (D'Mile) – songwriter, producer
- Eric Eylands – assistant audio engineer
- Kuk Harrell – vocal producer, vocal recording engineer
- Shani Gonzales – additional A&R
- Dianna "Wynter" Gordon – songwriter, background vocals
- Josh Gudwin – vocal recording engineer
- John "J-Banga" Kercy – Pro Tools engineer
- Jennifer Lopez – lead vocals

== Charts ==
Chart (2011)	Peak position
South Korea (Gaon International Digital Chart)	121
Spain (Promusicae)	33
