= One Love (Jennifer Lopez song) =

Song by Jennifer Lopez

from the album Love?
- Studio: Record Plant (Los Angeles, CA)
- Genre: R&B
- Length: 3:54
- Label: Island
- Songwriters: Jennifer Lopez; Anesha Birchett; Antea Shelton; Emile Dernst II
- Producers: D'Mile; Kuk Harrell

Audio video
- "One Love" on YouTube

"One Love" is a song recorded by American entertainer Jennifer Lopez for her seventh studio album, Love? (2011). The R&B song was written by Lopez, Anesha Birchett, Antea Shelton and Emile "D'Mile" Dernst II, the song's producer. "One Love" was initially written and presented to Lopez by A-Plus (Birchett and Shelton) and D'Mile to record, however, upon hearing the demo of the song, she was not pleased with its verses. Liking the chorus and idea of the song, Lopez wrote new verses to the song with the song's original writers.

"One Love" received generally positive reviews from music critics, who cited it as a stand-out track on Love?. Critics made note of the song's indirect manner, which according to them contains references to Lopez's ex-boyfriends and husbands, such as Sean Combs and Ben Affleck. Following the release of Love?, it was revealed that Lopez's first husband, Ojani Noa, intended to bring her to court over the song, claiming that it contained lyrics about him without his prior knowledge – violating agreements made between the two following their divorce. Despite this, it has been noted that Noa is not referenced in the song and the lawsuit never transpired.

== Production and lyrical interpretation ==
"One Love"
A twenty-nine second sample of "One Love", in which Lopez asks the listener: "is there one love?".

"One Love" is a R&B song, with a length of three minutes and fifty-four seconds (3:54). It was written by Lopez, along with A-Plus (Anesha Birchett and Antea Shelton) and the song's producer Emile "D'Mile" Dernst II. A-Plus (Birchett and Shelton) and D'Mile wrote and presented the song to Lopez, who loved the idea of it, but thought the track to be "very generic". In response, she asked: "Why don't we make it more 'me'?". Lopez then sat with them and wrote new verses for the song, going through every major relationship she had, asking the question: "is there one love?". Lopez described the song as being about "if we can ever have one true soul mate". She recorded her vocals for the song with Kuk Harrell at Record Plant Recording Studios, with additional vocal production from Josh Gudwin, Jim Annunziato and Birchett. John Kercy was responsible for Lopez's vocal editing on "One Love", which was later mixed by Mike "Handz" Donaldson at Chalice Recording Studios.

Allison Stewart from The Washington Post said that "One Love" examines all of her high-profiled relationships, and commented that Lopez is not "trying to gin up controversy with these red-meat tidbits about her personal life. She honestly thought you might be curious about Ben Affleck and whatever happened to that huge engagement ring he gave her all those years ago, during Bennifer’s dark reign."

== Critical response and lawsuit ==
"One Love" received generally positive reviews from music critics. Sal Cinquemani of Slant Magazine stated that beyond "One Love", "Love? doesn't dig very deep into its titular query". Monica Herrera from Billboard wrote in her track-by-track review of Love?: "'One Love' – "What's wrong with a girl wanting everything?" Jennifer wonders over this slow roller," and responded with "Nothing, when you're a triple-threat superstar." Robert Copsey from Digital Spy called the song generic, while Poppy Reid of The Music Network complimented the song for its lyrical content; stating that apart from other songs on Love?, Lopez is acting her age in "One Love", the album she wrote herself.

After the release of Love?, it was reported that Lopez's former husband Ojani Noa had filed a lawsuit against Lopez over "One Love", claiming that it contained lyrics about him without his prior knowledge. Noa's business partner Ed Meyer released a statement saying that the song violates agreements between Noa and Lopez in their divorce. He further stated that: "I have a conference with the attorney for J.Lo's partners in the publishing rights for this song on Monday, as we will be adding the dispute over One Love to the lawsuits [...] Any negative reference to Ojani Noa is prohibited by contract, and J.Lo would be in breach to Ojani Noa. Ojani Noa will be bringing a separate civil action over the song, as soon as the album is released, so as to avoid prior restraint, which we are accusing J.Lo of in our case."

== Live performances ==
Lopez performed "One Love" live on October 22, 2011 at an anniversary concert for the Mohegan Sun casino in Uncasville, Connecticut, as part of a medley with her debut single "If You Had My Love". Photographs of her past high-profile relationships appeared on a backdrop as she performed.

== Credits and personnel ==
Credits adapted from the liner notes of Love?.

- Jim Annunziato – recording engineer, vocal recording engineer
- Anesha Birchett – songwriter, vocal producer, background vocals
- Antea Shelton – songwriter
- Jennifer Lopez - lead vocals
- Mike "Handz" Donaldson – mixing engineer
- Emile Dernst II (D'Mile) – songwriter, producer
- Eric Eylands – assistant recording engineer
- Kuk Harrell – vocal producer, vocal recording engineer
- Shani Gonzales – additional A&R
- Josh Gudwin – vocal recording engineer
- John "J-Banga" Kercy – Pro Tools engineer

== Charts ==
Chart (2011)	Peak position
South Korea (Gaon International Download Chart)	171
