= Jennifer Lopez videography =

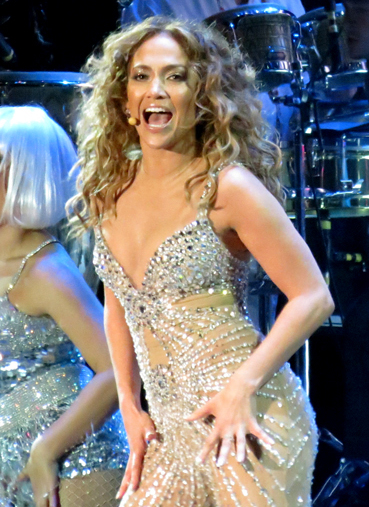
Lopez performing at the Pop Music Festival in June 2012, as part of her Dance Again tour

American singer and actress Jennifer Lopez has been featured in forty-six music videos and has released three video albums. Lopez's first music video was for "Baila", from the soundtrack of the movie Music of the Heart. She later ventured into a musical career, and her first video was for "If You Had My Love" from her debut album On the 6. Directed by Paul Hunter, the video was known for its theme of voyeurism. The third single's video for "Waiting for Tonight" was famed for its theme of counting down to the new year with this case being the new millennium. Lopez's videos are well known for having dance breaks, including her music videos for "If You Had My Love" (1999) and "Love Don't Cost a Thing" (2000)—she brought back dance breaks in her later music videos for "I'm Into You" and "Papi" (2011). Lopez's music video for "I'm Glad" (from her third studio album This Is Me... Then) was described as one of the more "complicated" videos which recreated scenes from a 1983 film Flashdance. "I'm Into You" was praised, Kyle Anderson from Entertainment Weekly applauded her natural beauty and said "that time-out at the three-quarters mark is as sharp as any diva dance break you’ll see." In her music video for "Papi", Lopez consumes a chocolate chip cookie which will allow her "love" to come back, given to her by her apartment mail attendant; she takes too large a bite, resulting in the magic of the cookie to become effective—groups of men chase her around town until her true love finds her.

Lopez was ranked at number twenty-one on VH1's "50 Greatest Women of the Video Era" list. Throughout her music videos, she has worked with several directors and choreographers, including working with Paul Hunter, Francis Lawrence and Dave Meyers several times. She is considered a sex symbol through her music videos. The music video for "I'm Glad" briefly led to a lawsuit for copyright infringement for re-creating scenes from the 1983 film, Flashdance, which was later dismissed.

== Music videos ==
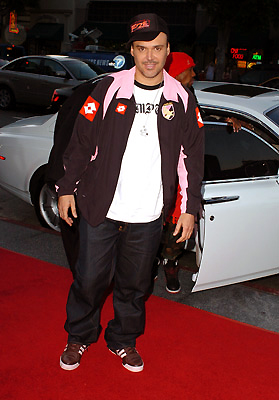
David LaChapelle (pictured), director of "I'm Glad" (2003) and "Do It Well" (2007).

Title	Other performer(s)	Director(s)	Originating album	Year	Ref.
"Baila"	None	Jim Gable	Music of the Heart / On the 6	1998	
"If You Had My Love"	None	Paul Hunter	On the 6	1999	
"No Me Ames"	Marc Anthony	Kevin Bray	On the 6	1999	
"Waiting for Tonight" (Note: A second music video to "Waiting for Tonight" was released using the "Hex Hector Remix".)	None	Francis Lawrence	On the 6	1999	
"Feelin' So Good"	Big Pun; Fat Joe	Paul Hunter	On the 6	2000	
"Let's Get Loud" (Note: The music video for "Let's Get Loud" is footage from Lopez's live performance at the 1999 FIFA Women's World Cup.)	None	Jeffrey Doe	On the 6	2000	
"Love Don't Cost a Thing"	None	Paul Hunter	J.Lo	2000	
"Play"	None	Francis Lawrence	J.Lo	2001	
"Ain't It Funny"	None	Herb Ritts	J.Lo	2001	
"I'm Real"	None	Dave Meyers	J.Lo	2001	
"I'm Real (Murder Remix)"	Ja Rule	Dave Meyers	J to tha L–O! The Remixes	2001	
"Ain't It Funny (Murder Remix)"	Ja Rule; Caddillac Tah	Cris Judd	J to tha L–O! The Remixes	2002	
"I'm Gonna Be Alright (Track Masters Remix)"	Nas	Dave Meyers	J to tha L–O! The Remixes	2002	
"Alive"	None	Jim Gable	J to tha L–O! The Remixes	2002	
"Jenny from the Block"	Styles P Jadakiss	Francis Lawrence	This Is Me... Then	2002	
"All I Have"	LL Cool J	Dave Meyers	This Is Me... Then	2002	
"I'm Glad"	None	David LaChapelle	This Is Me... Then	2003	
"Baby I Love U!"	None	Meiert Avis	This Is Me... Then	2003	
"Get Right" (Note: A second music video to "Get Right" was released using the remix featuring Fabolous.)	None	Francis Lawrence	Rebirth	2004	
"Hold You Down"	Fat Joe	Diane Martel	Rebirth	2005	
"Control Myself"	LL Cool J	Hype Williams	Todd Smith	2006	
"Qué Hiciste"	None	Michael Haussman	Como Ama una Mujer	2007	
"Me Haces Falta"	None	Sanji	Como Ama una Mujer	2007	
"Do It Well"	None	David LaChapelle	Brave	2007	
"Hold It Don't Drop It"	None	Melina Matsoukas	Brave	2007	
"Fresh Out the Oven" (Note: The viral video for "Fresh Out the Oven" is credited to "Jennifer Lopez as Lola featuring Pitbull".)	Pitbull	Jonas Åkerlund	—N/a	2009	
"Good Hit" (Note: The viral video for "Good Hit" only contains the first verse and the chorus of the song. The video was promoted as a "teaser", although no full video was produced. An alternate version of the video was leaked in February 2012, featuring footage from the album photo shoot from Love?.)	None	Alex Moors	Love?	2011	
"On the Floor"	Pitbull	TAJ Stansberry	Love?	2011	
"I'm Into You" (Note: Although featured in the song, Lil Wayne does not appear in the official video to "I'm Into You". A second version of the video was later released, featuring additional scenes with Lil Wayne.)	Lil Wayne	Melina Matsoukas	Love?	2011	
"Papi"	None	Paul Hunter	Love?	2011	
"T.H.E. (The Hardest Ever)"	will.i.am Mick Jagger	Rich Lee	—N/a	2011	
"Dance Again"	Pitbull	Paul Hunter	Dance Again... the Hits	2012	
"Follow the Leader"	Wisin & Yandel	Jessy Terrero	Líderes	2012	
"Goin' In"	Flo Rida	Ace Norton	Step Up Revolution	2012	
"Live It Up"	Pitbull	Jessy Terrero	—N/a	2013	
"Same Girl"	None	Gomillion & Leupold	A.K.A.	2014	
"Adrenalina"	Wisin; Ricky Martin	Jessy Terrero	El Regreso del Sobreviviente	2014	
"I Luh Ya Papi"	French Montana	Jessy Terrero	A.K.A.	2014	
"We Are One (Ole Ola)"	Pitbull; Claudia Leitte	Ben Mor	One Love, One Rhythm	2014	
"First Love"	None	Anthony Mandler	A.K.A.	2014	
"Emotions"	None	Emil Nava	A.K.A.	2014	
"Worry No More"	Rick Ross	Emil Nava	A.K.A.	2014	
"Booty"	Pitbull	Emil Nava	A.K.A.	2014	
"Booty"	Iggy Azalea	Hype Williams	A.K.A.	2014	
"Stressin"	Fat Joe	Eif Rivera	—N/a	2014	
"Feel the Light"	None	Hype Williams	Home	2015	
"Back It Up"	Prince Royce; Pitbull	Colin Tilley	Double Vision	2015	
"Ain't Your Mama"	None	Cameron Duddy	—N/a	2016	
"Love Make The World Go Round"	Lin-Manuel Miranda	—N/a	—N/a	2016	
"Chegaste"	Roberto Carlos	—N/a	—N/a	2016	
"Ni Tú Ni Yo"	Gente De Zona	Emil Nava	—N/a	2017	
"Amor, Amor, Amor"	Wisin	Jessy Terrero	—N/a	2017	
"Se Acabó el Amor"	Abraham Mateo; Yandel	Daniel Durán	—N/a	2018	
"El Anillo"	None	Santiago Salviche	—N/a	2018	
"Dinero"	DJ Khaled; Cardi B	Joseph Kahn	—N/a	2018	
"Te Guste"	Bad Bunny	Mike Ho	—N/a	2018	
"Limitless"	None	Jennifer Lopez	—N/a	2018	
"Medicine"	French Montana	Jora Frantzis	—N/a	2019	
"Pa' Ti + Lonely"	Maluma	Jessy Terrero	—N/a	2020	
"It’s the Most Wonderful Time of the Year"	Stevie Mackey; The Eleven	Santiago Salviche	—N/a	2020	
"In the Morning"	None	Jora Frantzis	—N/a	2021	
"Cambia el Paso"	Rauw Alejandro	Jessy Terrero	—N/a	2021	
"On My Way"	None	Santiago Salviche	Marry Me	2022	
"On My Way (TELYKast Remix)"	TELYKast	kennygfilms	Marry Me	2022	
"Marry Me (Ballad)"	Maluma	Santiago Salviche	Marry Me	2022	
"Marry Me (Kat & Bastian Duet)"	Maluma	Santiago Salviche	Marry Me	2022	
"Can't Get Enough"	—N/a	Dave Meyers	This Is Me...Now	2024	
"Can't Get Enough (Remix)"	Latto	Tanu Muiño	This Is Me...Now	2024	

== Guest appearances ==
Title	Performer(s)	Director(s)	Originating album	Year	Ref
"That's the Way Love Goes"	Janet Jackson	René Elizondo Jr.	Janet	1993	
"Been Around the World"	Puff Daddy; The Notorious B.I.G. & Mase	Paul Hunter	No Way Out	1998	
"No Me Conoces"	Marc Anthony	Benny Corral	Contra la Corriente	1998	
"It's So Hard"	Big Pun & Donell Jones	Chris Robinson	Yeeeah Baby	2000	
"El Ultimo Adios (The Last Goodbye)"	Various Artists	Emilio Estefan	El Ultimo Adios (The Last Goodbye)	2001	
"Becky from the Block"	Becky G	James Defina co-director: Chris Velona		2013	
"Stressin'"	Fat Joe	Eif Rivera		2014	
" El Mismo Sol (Under The Same Sun)[B-Case Remix] "	Alvaro Soler	Daniel Eceolaza		2015	
"Don't You Need Somebody"	RedOne ft. Enrique Iglesias, Shaggy, R. City and Serayah	Derek Pike	TBA	2016	
"Almost Like Praying"	All Star - Artists for Puerto Rico	Cesar Camacho, Lin-Manuel Miranda & Luis A. Miranda Jr.		2017	
"Girls Like You" (Original, Volume 2 and Vertical Video versions)	Maroon 5 featuring Cardi B	David Dobkin	Red Pill Blues	2018	
"Te Bote II"	Casper Magico, Nio Garcia, Cosculluela and Wisin y Yandel	Fernando Lugo		2018	
"Jealous"	DJ Khaled ft. Chris Brown, Lil Wayne and Big Sean	DJ Khaled & Eif Rivera	Father of Asahd	2019	
"It's the Most Wonderful Time of the Year"	Stevie Mackey & The Eleven	Santiago Salviche	The Most Wonderful Time	2020	

== Video albums ==
Title	Album details	Peak		Sales	Certifications
Title	Album details	US	FRA	Sales	Certifications
Jennifer Lopez: Feelin' So Good	Released: November 7, 2000; Label: SMV Enterprises; Formats: DVD, VHS	—	—		RIAA Video: Gold
Jennifer Lopez: Let's Get Loud	Released: February 11, 2003; Label: Epic; Formats: DVD, VHS	—	—		RIAA Video: Gold
The Reel Me	Released: November 18, 2003; Label: Epic; Formats: CD/DVD, music download	69	84	US: 275,000	RIAA Video: 3× Platinum; ARIA Video: Gold
"—" denotes items which were not released in that country or failed to chart.

== See also ==
- Sex symbol
