= Lemme (disambiguation) =

The Lemme is a torrent in north-western Italy.

Lemme may also refer to:

- Alicia Lemme (born 1954), Argentine politician
- Armin Lemme (born 1955), German track and field athlete
- Betta Lemme (born 1993), Canadian singer-songwriter
- Gabriel Lemme, Argentine weightlifter
- Helen Lemme (1904–1968), American civil rights activist
- Steve Lemme (born 1968), American actor and producer
- Lemme Rossi (died 1673), Italian music theorist

== See also ==
- Lemmes, commune in Grand-Est, France
- Lemma (disambiguation)
