= The Reel Me =

EP / video by Jennifer Lopez
- Released: November 18, 2003
- Length: 32:51 (CD)
- Label: Epic; Sony
- Director: Meiert Avis; Kevin Bray; Jim Gable; Paul Hunter; Cris Judd; David LaChapelle; Francis Lawrence; David Meyers; Herb Ritts
- Producer: Davy Deluge; Freddy Bastone; Jeffrey Bernstein; Ignorantz; Paul Oakenfold; Troy Oliver; Dave McPherson; Poke and Toke; R. Kelly; Cory Rooney; Ron G; Seismic Crew; Dan Shea

Jennifer Lopez album chronology
This Is Me... Then (2002)	The Reel Me (2003)	Rebirth (2005)

Jennifer Lopez video chronology
Jennifer Lopez: Let's Get Loud (2003)	The Reel Me (2003)

Professional ratings
Review scores
Source	Rating
AllMusic	4/5 stars
Video Librarian	2.5/4 stars

The Reel Me is an EP and music video compilation album by American singer and actress Jennifer Lopez. It was released on November 18, 2003 by Epic Records, containing all her hits at the time and a series of singles released from the albums On the 6 (1999), J.Lo (2001), J to tha Lo! The Remixes (2002) and This Is Me... Then (2002) respectively. Some of the original singles were replaced as the remix versions such as "Waiting for Tonight".

== Track listings ==
The Reel Me – Disc one (The DVD)
No.	Title	Writer(s)	Director(s)	Length
1.	"If You Had My Love"	Rodney Jerkins; LaShawn Daniels; Cory Rooney; Fred Jerkins III	Paul Hunter
2.	"No Me Ames" (featuring Marc Anthony)	Giancarlo Bigazzi; Aleandro Baldi; Marco Falagiani; Ignacio Ballesteros	Kevin Bray
3.	"Waiting for Tonight" (Hex Hector Remix)	Maria Christensen; Michael Garvin; Phil Temple	Francis Lawrence
4.	"Feelin' So Good"	Sean "Puffy" Combs; Steven Standard; Rooney; Jennifer Lopez; Christopher Rios; Joseph Cartagena	Hunter
5.	"Love Don't Cost a Thing"	Damon Sharpe; Greg Lawson; Georgette Franklin; Jeremy Monroe; Amille D. Harris	Hunter
6.	"Play"	Anders Bagge; Arnthor Birgisson; Christina Milian; Rooney	Lawrence
7.	"I'm Real"	Lopez; Troy Oliver; Rooney; L.E.S; Martin Denny	David Meyers
8.	"I'm Real" (Remix featuring Ja Rule)	Lopez; T. Oliver; Rooney; L.E.S.; Jeffrey Atkins; Irving Lorenzo; Rick James	Meyers
9.	"Ain't It Funny"	Lopez; Rooney	Herb Ritts
10.	"Alive"	Lopez; Cris Judd; Rooney	Jim Gable
11.	"Ain't It Funny" (Remix featuring Ja Rule)	Lopez; Rooney; Lorenzo; Atkins; Caddillac Tah	Judd
12.	"I'm Gonna Be Alright" (Track Masters Remix featuring Nas)	Lopez; Rooney; T. Oliver; Denzil Foster; Thomas McElroy; Jay King; Jean Claude Olivier; Samuel Barnes	Meyers
13.	"Jenny from the Block" (featuring Styles and Jadakiss)	Lopez; T. Oliver; Mr. Deyo; Barnes; Olivier; José Fernando Arbex Miró; Lawrence Parker; Scott Sterling; Michael Oliver	Lawrence
14.	"All I Have" (featuring LL Cool J)	Lopez; James Todd Smith; Makeba Riddick; Curtis Richardson; Ron G; Dave McPherson; Lisa Peters; William Jeffrey	Meyers
15.	"I'm Glad"	Lopez; T. Oliver; Rooney; Mr. Deyo; Jesse Weaver Jr.	David LaChapelle
16.	"Baby I Love U!"	Lopez; Rooney; Dan Shea; John Barry	Meiert Avis

The Reel Me – Disc one (The CD)
No.	Title	Writer(s)	Producer(s)	Length
1.	"Baby I Love U!"	Lopez; Rooney; Shea; Barry	Rooney; Shea	4:29
2.	"Jenny from the Block" (Seismic Crew's Latin Disco Trip)	Lopez; T. Oliver; Mr. Deyo; Barnes; Olivier; Miró; Parker; Sterling; M. Oliver	T. Oliver; Rooney; Poke and Toke; Seismic Crew	6:41
3.	"All I Have" (featuring LL Cool J) (Ignorants Remix)	Lopez; Smith; Riddick; Richardson; Ron G; McPherson; Peters; Jeffrey	Rooney; Ron G; McPherson; Ignorants	4:03
4.	"I'm Glad" (Paul Oakenfold Perfecto Remix)	Lopez; T. Oliver; Rooney; Mr. Deyo	T. Oliver; Rooney; Paul Oakenfold	5:47
5.	"The One" (Bastone & Burnz Club Mix)	Lopez; Rooney; Davy Deluge; Linda Creed; Thom Bell	Rooney; Deluge; Shea; Freddy Bastone; Jeffrey Bernstein	7:40
6.	"Baby I Love U!" (R. Kelly Remix)	Lopez; Rooney; Shea; Barry; R. Kelly	Rooney; Shea; Kelly	4:11
Total length:				32:51

== Charts ==
Chart (2003)	Peak position
Australian Music DVD (ARIA)	16
French Albums (SNEP)	84
Japanese Albums (Oricon)	13
UK Music Videos (OCC)	19
U.S. Billboard 200	69
U.S. Billboard Top Music Videos	7

== Certifications ==
Video certifications for The Reel Me
Region	Certification	Certified units/sales
Australia (ARIA)	Gold	7,500^{^}
United Kingdom (BPI)	Gold	25,000^{*}
United States (RIAA)	3× Platinum	300,000^{^}
^{*} Sales figures based on certification alone.^{^} Shipments figures based on certification alone.

== Release history ==
List of release dates, with country released, format and record label
Country	Date	Format(s)	Label
United States	November 18, 2003	CD/DVD	Epic Records
France	November 24, 2003	CD/DVD	Sony Music Entertainment
United Kingdom	November 24, 2003	CD/DVD	Sony Music Entertainment
Canada	November 25, 2003	CD/DVD	Sony Music Entertainment
