= Dilemma (disambiguation) =

A dilemma is a choice between two undesirable options. It can also refer to a double proposition in logics.

Dilemma may also refer to:

== Geography ==
- Dilemma Geyser, Yellowstone National Park, United States
- Dilemma Glacier, Antarctica
- Dilemma Peak, New Zealand

== Arts, entertainment, and media ==
- The Dilemma (1914 film), a silent movie
- Dilemmas (1954), a collection of short pieces by the British philosopher, Gilbert Ryle (1900–1976)
- Dilemma (1962 Danish film), a Danish film based on the apartheid novel 'A World of Strangers'
- Dilemma (1962 British film), a British crime film starring Peter Halliday
- The Dilemma (2011), a comedy film
- Dilemma (novel), a 1999 novel by Jon Cleary
- "Dilemma" (Apink song), 2022
- "Dilemma" (Green Day song), 2024
- "Dilemma" (Nelly song), 2002
- "Dilemma", a song by Death Grips, from the 2018 album Year of the Snitch
- "Dilemma", a song by Band-Maid, from the 2019 album Conqueror
- "Dilemma", a song by Stefflon Don featuring Sidhu Moose Wala, GuiltyBeatz and Steel Banglez, from the 2024 album Island 54

== See also ==
- Lemma (disambiguation)
- Tetralemma
- Trilemma
- False dilemma
