= All I Have (song) =

2002 single by Jennifer Lopez

Single by Jennifer Lopez featuring LL Cool J

from the album This Is Me... Then and 10
- B-side: "Loving You"
- Released: December 14, 2002
- Studio: The Hit Factory (New York City)
- Genre: R&B; hip-hop
- Length: 4:14
- Label: Epic
- Songwriters: Jennifer Lopez; James Todd Smith; Makeba Riddick; Curtis Richardson; Ron G; Dave McPherson; Lisa Peters; William Jeffrey
- Producers: Cory Rooney; Ron G; Dave McPherson

Jennifer Lopez singles chronology
"Jenny from the Block" (2002)	"All I Have" (2002)	"I'm Glad" (2003)

LL Cool J singles chronology
"Luv U Better" (2002)	"All I Have" (2002)	"Paradise" (2003)

Music video
- "All I Have" on YouTube

"All I Have" is a song by the American singer Jennifer Lopez, featuring American rapper LL Cool J. Written by Lopez, LL Cool J, Makeba Riddick, Curtis Richardson, and Ron G and produced by Cory Rooney, Ron G, and Dave McPherson, it was released on December 14, 2002, as the second single from Lopez's third album, This Is Me... Then (2002).

"All I Have" samples "Very Special" by Debra Laws, whose songwriters, Lisa Peters and William Jeffrey, are also credited on the track. It became the subject of a 2003 lawsuit filed by Laws against Sony Music Entertainment over the alleged misappropriation of her voice and the use of her name in the credits. The song is a midtempo R&B and hip-hop ballad, about moving on after a breakup. It received favorable reviews from music critics who applauded the chemistry between Lopez and LL Cool J.

The song was a success on the charts, reaching number one in the United States and in three other countries while also entering the top 10 in several more. After the success of the song, the track was included on the re-issue of LL Cool J's album 10 (2002). The song ranked at number 15 on the 2003 year-end Billboard Hot 100 and at number 34 on Billboard's 2011 list of the 40 biggest duets of all time. Furthermore, Lopez named her 2016 Las Vegas Residency Show after the song.

== Background and release ==
"J. Lo is definitely one of the most focused people I ever met (...) I could see why she's so successful. She definitely has all the star qualities. We got along real well — we made a hot record too.... I like it a lot.... Me and her are getting into it, we had beef on the record. It ain't always peaches and cream. I am trying to reason with her but she ain't trying to hear it."

LL Cool J discussing "All I Have", MTV News.

"All I Have" was the last song written and recorded for the album as Sony Music Entertainment's chairman Tommy Mottola and Epic Records's A&R David McPherson felt the album needed one more hit - following "Jenny from the Block"'s successful run on the charts. A promotion executive suggested McPherson the idea of covering the song "Very Special" by Debra Laws. However, McPherson united with producer Ron G and he created a beat that sampled "Very Special". Laws' vocals were pitch-shifted to create a "helium chirp" as noted by Tom Breihan of Stereogum.

Later, McPherson asked songwriter Makeba Riddick to write to the beat that McPherson and Ron G made, "telling the story of a couple drifting apart." Riddick brought her songwriting partner Curtis Richardson to help her in the songwriting process. The song was initially titled "I'm Good", however to avoid comparisions to another Lopez's song, "I'm Real", it was changed to "All I Have" instead. Lopez's longtime producer Cory Rooney got LL Cool J to be featured on it, and after he agreed, Lopez heard the song, adding a few verses to it.

On October 19, 2002, the American rapper LL Cool J revealed that he had just recorded a song for Lopez's upcoming album two days prior, saying: "We did a new song for her album. Well it's actually going to be her next single, I think – it's a lot of fun, a lot of fun." He stated that, "It's got like a mid-tempo beat, pretty melody, you know what I'm saying. I'm rapping, she's singing. We go back and forth with stuff. It's kind of cool, it's fly."

Initially, Lopez did not want "All I Have" to be released as a single, as she believed it was too musically similar to her previous singles such as "Ain't It Funny" and "I'm Real"; she felt like she was "visiting old territory". "Those tracks were like a different era for me, and I didn't want people to perceive it like I'm just trying to capitalize on the same thing. But the record company was like, 'Who cares what they think, those are hits mama!'". Lopez, who said she "calls the shots", eventually agreed. The song was officially sent to urban radio in the United States on December 14, 2002, as the second single from This Is Me... Then. It was later released on March 10, 2003, in the United Kingdom and Australia.

== Composition ==
"All I Have"
A twenty-six-second sample of "All I Have"

"All I Have" was written by Lopez, James Todd Smith, Makeba Riddick, Curtis Richardson, Ron G, and Dave McPherson while production was handled by Cory Rooney, Ron G, and McPherson. Recorded at The Hit Factory in New York City, the song was originally titled "I'm Good" and heavily samples Debra Laws's song "Very Special", written by Lisa Peters and William Jeffrey. Featuring LL Cool J, "All I Have" is a midtempo R&B and hip hop ballad about moving on after a break up. On the track, Lopez decides to end her relationship due to her lover's infidelity, while LL Cool J attempts to "make up" with her. It also features female empowerment lyrics in the pre-chorus, such as, "Cause I'm good holdin' down my spot/ And I'm good reppin' the girls on the block/ And I'm good, I got this thing on lock/ So without me you'll be fine, right." A writer for MTV observed the song to conjure up her own public split with P. Diddy.

== Copyright lawsuits ==
In March 2003, Debra Laws sued Sony Music Entertainment/Epic Records in the United States District Court for the Central District of California, claiming that the use of samples from "Very Special" without her consent (even though the writers of "Very Special" and Elektra Entertainment Group—successor to Elektra/Asylum Records, which had released the original recording of "Very Special"—had given their consent to the use of the samples) violated her statutory and common law right of publicity under California law. In November 2003, Judge Lourdes Baird granted Sony Music's motion for summary judgment on the ground that Laws's state law claims were preempted by Section 301 of the United States Copyright Act. In 2006, that decision was affirmed by the United States Court of Appeals for the Ninth Circuit.

== Critical response ==
The duet was appreciated by critics. Billboard staff praised the collaboration, noting, "while the tune is about splitsville, Jenny from the block and Mr. James manage to separate in style and grace." Sam Lansky of MTV Buzzworthy described the duet as "icy-cool", while Sal Cinquemani of Slant Magazine characterized it as "playful". Writing for a Grammy article, Princess Gabbera lauded their chemistry as "undeniable", saying "the song's call-and-response quality is what makes it so fun to sing along to even after all these years." Erika Ramirez of Vibe agreed, writing that Lopez "still generates heat with partner LL on this effervescent collabo".

Solo praise for LL Cool J was given, though it also received some criticism. Tom Sinclair of Entertainment Weekly praised him for being a "high-spirited guest" on the song, while Chris Hopfensperger of The Washington Post claimed he "steps in and steals the show". In contrast, Tom Breihan of Stereogum penned his "seduction attempts", calling them "obnoxious". Stephen Robinson of Hot Press claimed the rapper "can’t disguise its ordinariness."

Commentary about Lopez vocals were also made. A write for StaiMusic noted the song "emphasizes her ability to convey emotion through music." Amy Sciarretto of PopCrush characterized Lopez's vocals as "cooed" and found the song to have a "classic feel". About.com's Bill Lamb agreed, writing, "There is a relaxed, charming elegance here that sounds timeless." Mirjana Jovetic from the South China Morning Post claimed the song "works", while Jason Shawhan of About.com named it a "'Christmastime' breakup theme", comparing to Lopez's "No Me Ames" "in terms of its hyperexaggerated emotions."

== Accolades ==
The song was nominated for two Teen Choice Awards in 2003 on the categories, "Choice Music Single" and "Choice Music Hook-Up", but lost it for Avril Lavigne's "Sk8er Boi" and 50 Cent and Nate Dogg's "21 Questions", respectively. In May 2003, "All I Have" received a BDSCertified Spin Award, signifying 200,000 radio spins. In 2004, it received an ASCAP Pop Music Award and a BMI Pop Award.

"All I Have" was also part of many listicles of best Jennifer Lopez songs. It ranked sixth in Complex list, with the writer saying the song "was everything you needed in an aughties hit from two stars who only trafficked in hits. Chirping throwback samples were the wave in the early Kanye West era of hip-hop, and here you have Debra Laws’ voice in the background. You needed iconic imagery, and that picture of LL Cool J and Lopez cuddled up in winter coats still pops up every now and then." Ashley Simone Johnson of Business Insider listed Lopez's best and worst song for each album of hers, choosing "All I Have" as the best from This is Me...Then, noting the song is "on par with other early-2000s duets like Ja Rule and Ashanti's "Always on Time" and Nelly and Kelly Rowland's "Dilemma." Billboard placed at number thirty-four on their 2011 list of the 40 biggest duets of all time. It also ranked #10 and #9 on Pedestrian and Capital Xtra lists, respectively.

== Chart performance ==
For the week of December 28, 2002, "All I Have" entered the US Billboard Hot 100 at number 25, earning as the "Hot Shot Debut" of the week. It not only became highest-debuting song of Lopez's career at the time, but it was also the highest-debuting song on the chart since September 2001. For the week of January 30, 2003, the single reached number one on the Hot 100, giving Lopez her fourth number-one song and LL Cool J his first on the chart. It was also the Hot 100's fastest-growing track at radio. It remained at the summit of the Hot 100 for four weeks, later being displaced by 50 Cent's "In da Club". It also attained the top position on the Mainstream Top 40 chart, and it reached number four on the Hot R&B/Hip-Hop Singles & Tracks chart. Due to the song's success, LL Cool J included it on a reissue of his album 10 (2002). This allowed the album to register a 491% week-to-week sales gain and re-enter the top 10 of the US Billboard 200, jumping from number 84 to number nine for the issue dated February 22, 2003. "All I Have" was ranked fifteenth on the 2003 year-end Billboard Hot 100; it is also Lopez's most recent song to top the Hot 100, as of 2026.

On the UK Singles Chart, "All I Have" peaked at number two, becoming Lopez's highest-charting single there since "Love Don't Cost a Thing", which reached number one the previous year. Years later, Lopez's collaboration with LL Cool J on his track "Control Myself" also peaked at number two, on May 13, 2006. In New Zealand, "All I Have" debuted at number 42 on the RIANZ Singles Chart, on March 2, 2003. The song eventually peaked at number one for a week, becoming Lopez's third number-one single in New Zealand. It was later certified gold by the Recording Industry Association of New Zealand (RIANZ) for sales of 7,500 copies. In Australia, the song debuted at number three on the ARIA Singles Chart, becoming Lopez's highest debut there. It later spent three weeks at number five, before climbing and remaining for two weeks at number four. Finally, the song peaked at number two on May 4, 2003. It was later certified platinum by the Australian Recording Industry Association (ARIA), for shipping over 70,000 units.

== Music video ==
The music video for "All I Have" was directed by Dave Meyers, and was shot in New York City in November 2002. MTV News revealed that Lopez and LL Cool J would be playing ex-lovers in the music video. According to a synopsis provided by Meyers' production company, "They keep seeing visions of each other, and you get the feeling that they are still very much in love, yet they don't get back together because they feel that this is the best thing for them. It will have a very happy winter wonderland-type feel, but a sad vibe." The video was shot right before Thanksgiving, but did not premiere on television until after Christmas.

The video features Lopez and LL as former lovers now broken up. The two recall the good and bad times while dealing with being alone for the holidays. Lopez shows up to LL's house with a gift. With him not there, she puts the gift under the tree. He later sees the gift under the tree and realizes it was from Lopez. He opens the gift and sees a golden key. Upset at the relationship being over, he throws the key in the fireplace while a tearful Lopez gets help from her friends with her things.

The music video became one of the most played clips on networks such as MTV, VH1 and BET. While analyzing her DVD The Reel Me, Jason Shawhan of About.com claimed that "the most notable aspect of the audiovisual experience is the Debra Laws's "Very Special" sample which runs counterpoint to the Lopez/LL Cool J interplay."

== Live performances ==
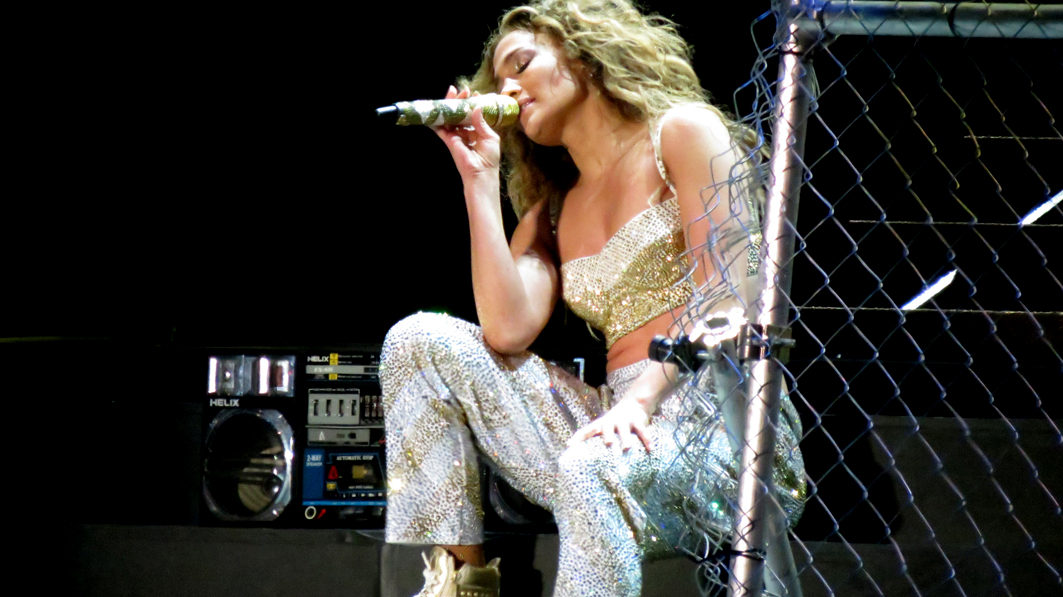
Lopez performing "All I Have" during her Dance Again World Tour in São Paulo, Brazil, June 2012

Lopez and LL Cool J performed "All I Have" on The Today Show for the episode dated December 6, 2002. The performance took place during her concert at Kips Bay High School, Lopez's alma mater. The song was included on the set list for her Dance Again World Tour (2012), including the song as part of a "Back-to-Bronx" hip hop medley. They also performed the song twice in 2003 as part of Top of the Pops in the United Kingdom.

Lopez included the song on the set list for her 2016 Las Vegas residency show, Jennifer Lopez: All I Have. She performed it as a duet with surprise guest Ne-Yo during the show's opening night on January 20, 2016, with Ne-Yo taking on LL Cool J's verses. The two also covered "Very Special" together. Prince Royce joined Lopez on stage days later during another night of the residency, where the two performed "Very Special" and "All I Have". Lopez later performed the song as part of her medley during the 2018 MTV Video Music Awards on August 20, 2018, at Radio City Music Hall in New York City. In 2019, the song was part of her It's My Party Tour in 2019. In 2021, Lopez and LL Cool J reunited to perform the song again on Global Citizen Festival. "All I Have" was part of the tour Up All Night: Live in 2025 and the residency Up All Night Live in Las Vegas in 2026.

== Track listings ==
Canadian CD single

1. "All I Have" (album version) – 4:15
2. "Jenny from the Block" (Seismic Crew's Latin Disco Trip) – 6:41
3. "Jenny from the Block" (Everbots Showtime mix) – 6:00

UK CD1

1. "All I Have" (album version) – 4:15
2. "All I Have" (instrumental) – 4:15
3. "Loving You" (album version) – 3:46
4. "All I Have" (video version)

UK CD2

1. "All I Have" (album version) – 4:15
2. "Jenny from the Block" (Seismic Crew's Latin Disco Trip) – 6:41
3. "Jenny from the Block" (Everbots Showtime mix radio edit) – 3:44

UK cassette single

1. "All I Have" (album version) – 4:15
2. "Jenny from the Block" (Everbots Showtime mix) – 6:00

European CD1

1. "All I Have" (radio edit) – 4:00
2. "Jenny from the Block" (Seismic Crew's Latin Disco Trip radio edit) – 3:26

European CD2

1. "All I Have" (album version) – 4:15
2. "Jenny from the Block" (Everbots Showtime mix radio edit version 2) – 3:44
3. "Jenny from the Block" (Seismic Crew's Latin Disco Trip radio edit) – 3:26
4. "Loving You" (album version) – 3:46
5. "All I Have" (instrumental) – 4:15
6. "All I Have" (video)

Australian CD single

1. "All I Have" (album version) – 4:15
2. "Jenny from the Block" (Everbots Showtime mix) – 6:00
3. "Jenny from the Block" (Seismic Crew's Latin Disco Trip radio edit) – 3:26
4. "Loving You" (album version) – 3:46

== Charts ==
=== Weekly charts ===
Chart (2003)	Peak position
Australia (ARIA)	2
Australian Urban (ARIA)	1
Austria (Ö3 Austria Top 40)	38
Belgium (Ultratop 50 Flanders)	18
Belgium (Ultratop 50 Wallonia)	16
Canada (Nielsen SoundScan)	6
Canada CHR (Nielsen BDS)	3
Croatia International (HRT)	1
European Hot 100 Singles (Music & Media)	4
European Radio Top 50 (Music & Media)	7
France (SNEP)	29
Germany (GfK)	19
Hungary (Editors' Choice Top 40)	12
Ireland (IRMA)	7
Italy (FIMI)	13
Netherlands (Dutch Top 40)	3
Netherlands (Single Top 100)	5
New Zealand (Recorded Music NZ)	1
Panama (Notimex)	1
Peru (Notimex)	5
Portugal (AFP)	9
Romania (Romanian Top 100)	37
Scottish Singles Sales (Official Charts)	6
Sweden (Sverigetopplistan)	15
Switzerland (Schweizer Hitparade)	4
UK Singles (Official Charts)	2
UK Hip Hop/R&B (Official Charts)	1
US Billboard Hot 100	1
US Hot R&B/Hip-Hop Songs (Billboard)	4
US Pop Airplay (Billboard)	1
US Rhythmic Airplay (Billboard)	1

=== Year-end charts ===
Chart (2003)	Position
Australia (ARIA)	11
Australian Urban (ARIA)	6
Belgium (Ultratop 50 Flanders)	89
Belgium (Ultratop 50 Wallonia)	90
Colombia (B & V Marketing)	7
Ireland (IRMA)	60
Netherlands (Dutch Top 40)	49
Netherlands (Single Top 100)	52
New Zealand (RIANZ)	37
Sweden (Hitlistan)	100
Switzerland (Schweizer Hitparade)	73
UK Singles (OCC)	29
US Billboard Hot 100	15
US Hot R&B/Hip-Hop Singles & Tracks (Billboard)	42
US Mainstream Top 40 (Billboard)	12
US Rhythmic Top 40 (Billboard)	17

== Certifications ==
Region	Certification	Certified units/sales
Australia (ARIA)	2× Platinum	140,000^{‡}
New Zealand (RMNZ)	Gold	5,000^{*}
New Zealand (RMNZ) Digital	Platinum	30,000^{‡}
United Kingdom (BPI)	Gold	400,000^{‡}
United States (RIAA)	Platinum	1,000,000^{‡}
^{*} Sales figures based on certification alone.^{‡} Sales+streaming figures based on certification alone.

== Release history ==
Release datesand formats for "All I Have"
Region	Date	Format	Label	Ref.
United States	December 14, 2002	Urban radio	Epic	
Australia	March 10, 2003	CD single	Sony BMG	
Germany	March 10, 2003	CD single	Sony BMG	
United Kingdom	March 10, 2003	CD single	Sony BMG	
Canada	March 25, 2003	CD single	Epic	
