= Lema =

Lema may refer to:

== Places ==
=== Benin ===
- Lèma, Dassa-Zoumè
- Lèma, Savalou

=== United States ===
- Lema, California, former Pomo settlement in Mendocino County
- Lake Eustis Museum of Art (LEMA), Florida

=== Elsewhere ===
- Lema, Ticino, Switzerland
- Monte Lema, a mountain between Switzerland and Italy
- Sierra de Lema, a mountain range in Bolívar state, Venezuela
- Lema Fracture Zone, next to the Vema fracture zone in the Atlantic Ocean

== People ==
=== People with the surname ===
- Chris Lema (born 1995), an American soccer player
- Cristian Lema (born 1990), an Argentine footballer
- Elieshi Lema (born 1949), a Tanzanian writer
- Godbless Lema (born 1976), a Tanzanian politician
- Nino Lema, Benigno 'Nino' Lema Mejuto (born 1964), a Spanish retired footballer
- Ray Lema, Raymond Lema A'nsi Nzinga (born 1946), a musician from Democratic Republic of the Congo
- Tony Lema (1934–1966), American professional golfer

=== People with the given name ===
- Lema Kusa (born 1944), a graphic artist and painter from Democratic Republic of the Congo
- Lema Mabidi, (born 1993) a professional footballer from Democratic Republic of the Congo

== Other uses ==
- Lema (beetle), a genus of beetles in the family Chrysomelidae
- Lema (company), a front-company of the Civil Cooperation Bureau in Johannesburg, South Africa
- LEMA, a local emergency management agency

== See also ==
- Lemma (disambiguation)
- Lemar (born 1978), a singer
- Ley de Lemas, electoral law in some Spanish-speaking regions
