= I'm Glad =

2003 single by Jennifer Lopez

Single by Jennifer Lopez

from the album This Is Me... Then
- Released: April 7, 2003
- Studio: Hit Factory (New York City)
- Genre: R&B
- Length: 3:42
- Label: Epic
- Songwriters: Jennifer Lopez; Troy Oliver; Cory Rooney; Mr. Deyo; Jesse Weaver Jr.
- Producers: Troy Oliver; Cory Rooney

Jennifer Lopez singles chronology
"All I Have" (2002)	"I'm Glad" (2003)	"Baby I Love U!" (2003)

Music video
- "I'm Glad" on YouTube

"I'm Glad" is a song by American singer and actress Jennifer Lopez for her third studio album, This Is Me... Then (2002). It was written by Lopez, Troy Oliver, Cory Rooney, Mr. Deyo and Jesse Weaver Jr. and produced by Oliver and Rooney. It was released as the album's third single on April 7, 2003. It is an uptempo R&B song that samples Schooly D's "P.S.K. What Does It Mean?" (1986). Lyrically, the song talks about finding true love after waiting for a long time. It was rumoured to be about her relationship with her then-boyfriend actor Ben Affleck, who served as the album's muse.

Critics who analyzed the track commended it for being elegant, while picking as an album highlight and complimenting the sample usage. Commercially, "I'm Glad" experienced moderate success in the United States, peaking at number 32 on the Billboard Hot 100 chart, while also reaching the top 20 on the Mainstream Top 40 and Rhythmic Top 40 charts, while reaching number four on the Dance Club Play chart. Elsewhere, it fared better, reaching the top-ten in Australia and Canada, while also reaching the top 20 in over seven nations.

The "I'm Glad" music video was directed by David LaChapelle and pays homage to the film Flashdance (1983). Similar to the storyline of the film, Lopez portrays a young aspiring dancer who spends her days welding and her nights performing at a bar. The video was topic was the subject of extensive controversy, with Paramount Pictures, the production company behind Flashdance, suing Lopez and Sony Music for copyright infringement due to the recreation of the film’s dance sequences. Despite its controversy, the video was nominated for four 2003 MTV Video Music Awards and was hailed as one of the sexiest music videos ever made. Lopez only performed the song during her 2018 MTV Video Music Awards medley, the 2021 Global Citizen Live Festival and her Apple Music Live concert in 2024.

== Background and composition ==
Jennifer Lopez's third studio album This Is Me... Then was released in November 2002. It featured the entertainer in a more "hands-on role" than ever before, writing more material. Her fiancé at the time, actor Ben Affleck, was her muse and inspiration for the album's lyrics; the title referred to "who you are at the time", and it was something Lopez wanted to look back on in the future. Affleck and Lopez became a prominent supercouple in popular culture, referred to as "Bennifer" by the public. "Jenny from the Block" (featuring Styles P and Jadakiss) was released as the album's lead single, peaking at number three on the US Billboard Hot 100, while its second single "All I Have" (featuring LL Cool J), topped the Hot 100. However, Lopez was initially dissatisfied with the release of both singles. She felt that the tracks were too similar to her previous singles such as "Ain't It Funny" and "I'm Real"; she felt like she was "visiting old territory". She subsequently released "I'm Glad" as the album's third single, with it being serviced to Top 40 radio and Rhythmic radio on April 7, 2003. The song was issued in the United Kingdom on June 9, 2003, across three formats: a CD single, and DVD single, and a cassette single. In Australia, a CD single was distributed on June 23, 2003. Lopez re-recorded her vocals for the Paul Oakenfold's "Perfecto remix".

"I'm Glad" is an uptempo R&B ballad which runs for a duration of three minutes and forty-two seconds. Lopez wrote the song with the assistance of Troy Oliver, Cory Rooney, Andre Deyo and Schooly D, with Oliver and Rooney serving as producers. She recorded her vocals for the track with Peter Wade Keusch and Bruce Swedien at The Hit Factory recording studios in New York City, where it was also mixed. "I'm Glad" contains a sample of the 1986 Schooly D song "P.S.K. What Does It Mean?". Its instrumentation consists of classical harp runs laced throughout a computer-generated beat. Written in the key of Db Major, Lopez's vocal spans from an A_{3} to a C_{5}. Its instrumentation includes the use of piano and guitar. "I'm Glad" is about finding true love, containing lyrics such as "I think I'm in love. Damn, finally". The Boston Globe noted the song's lyrics to be about her relationship with actor Ben Affleck, who served as Lopez's muse for This Is Me... Then.

== Reception ==
=== Critical ===
Steven Morse of The Boston Globe praised the song, describing it as "elegantly" structured, while Stephen Thomas Erlewine picked "I'm Glad" as one of the album's best tracks for his AllMusic review. Quentin Harrison of Albumism commended the usage of the "P.S.K. What Does It Mean?" sample for "refashioning its percussive elements to act as the perfect foil for the melancholic melody of Lopez's song." The Paul Oakenfold "Perfecto remix" was highly applauded by Jason Shawhan of About.com, noting that "the half-time compression on the chorus vocals kill it dead," while the "Murk remix" was seen as "a disco masterpiece that brought some deep drama to the track." The song was nominated for Choice Love Song at the 2003 Teen Choice Awards.

=== Commercial ===
"I'm Glad" entered the US Billboard Hot 100 at number 64, on the issue date May 3, 2003. In its fourth week on the chart, the song climbed to its peak position of number 32, making it her lowest-charting single since "Feelin' So Good" in 2000. It was more successful on the Billboard Dance Club Play chart, peaking at number four on the issue date July 12, 2003. It also peaked at number 13 on both the Mainstream Top 40 and Rhythmic Top 40 charts. The song peaked at 11 on the UK singles chart, spending 14 weeks on the chart. "I'm Glad" debuted and peaked at number eight in Canada, becoming her eighth top-10 hit on the Canadian chart and the third consecutive from the album. It also entered the Australian Singles Chart at number 10, its peak position, and was later certified gold by the Australian Recording Industry Association (RIAA).

== Music video ==
=== Development and synopsis ===
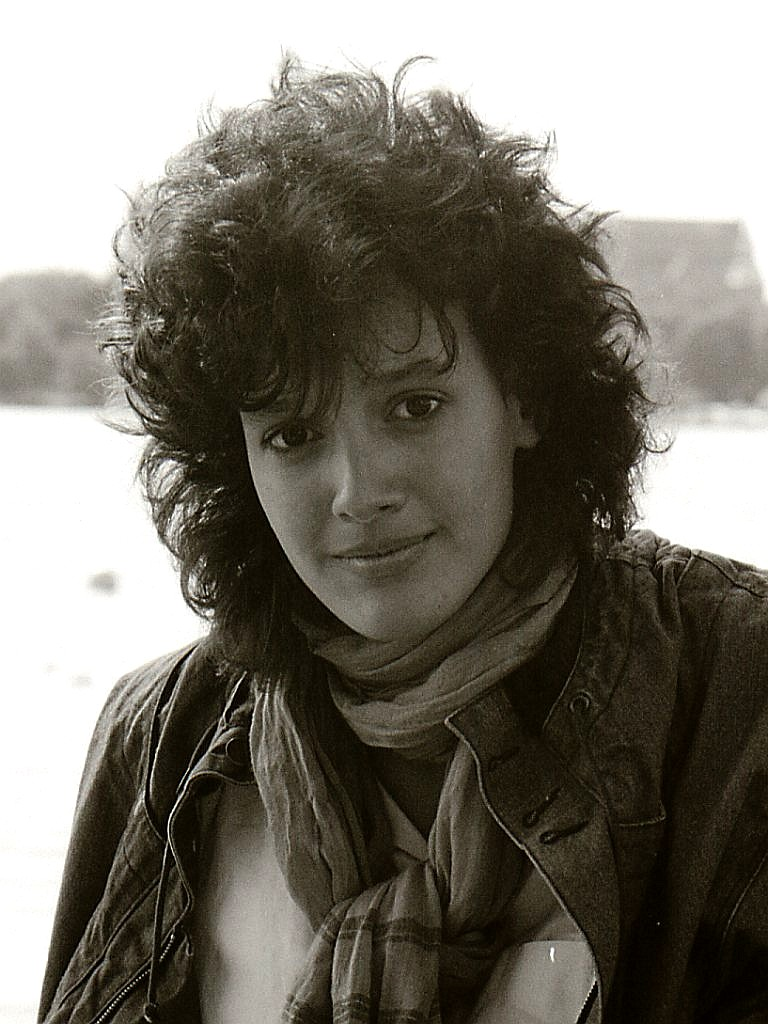
The video is a recreation of the storyline of the film Flashdance.

The music video for "I'm Glad" was filmed in February 2003. When coming up with ideas for the video, Lopez's only goal was to dance by herself without the help of any other people. She hired David LaChapelle to direct, and he then came up with the idea to recreate the film Flashdance (1983). LaChapelle identically fashioned the "sets, iconography, and costuming" of Flashdance as a back-drop for Lopez to dance. For the music video, Lopez sported her natural curly hair, leotards and "tiny pants". She spent several hours at night perfecting the music video, taking part in the editing process herself.

During the music video's editing stages, Lopez wanted to make sure everything was authentic. She said, "I really worked out and did the diet thing... and then after the video...there's always that one guy who's like 'We should retouch this'. I was like, 'You're going to leave everything the way it is. That's how it wiggles and jiggles in real life, that's how they're going to see it in the video. And I noticed—[the editors] sent [the video] to me and they have shaved off a little bit of my hips and—I was like, 'That ain't me—those are not my hips. Just leave them the way they are. Do me a favor—don't touch my hips. Don't try to make me look skinnier. It's fine, it's fine the way it is'. And that's what they did." Prior to the clip being released, Jon Wiederhorn of MTV News reported that it was heavily influenced by the 1980s, stating that Lopez "strikes '80s dance moves, and the color, style and camerawork have a decidedly retro vibe".

Identical to the storyline in Flashdance, Lopez plays a young aspiring dancer who welds by day and dances by night at a bar. The clip begins with Lopez entering a dance studio wearing a puffy jacket and scarf. She has arrived at an audition, with a table of judges present. Suddenly, the screen switches to showing different aspects of her life, including her at her modest home, riding through the neighborhood on a bike with her dog running along, as well as her role as an exotic dancer at a local bar and grill. Later, at a strip club, she is seen dancing to intricate choreography clothed in a skimpy red top. She then appears exercising and practicing her dance moves in another location. The screen then switches to before she entered the dance audition; she walks through a line of intimidating beautiful ballerinas. Lopez's dance routine in front of the judges then commences her audition, which includes her dancing on the judge's table, as they move their feet to the music.

=== Reception ===
A writer from The New York Times praised the video, stating that Lopez "has taken what's thrilling about the movie - the idea of a working-class girl who makes her mark on the world - and presented it as a buffed-up fairy-tale version of her own career", calling Lopez a "pleasure to watch". About.com's Jason Shawhan considered it her second best video, behind "Waiting for Tonight", and called it one of her most "interesting efforts", describing the dance work on display as "punishing". Writing for the UGO Networks, K. Thor Jensen placed the video seventeenth on a list of the "50 Sexiest Music Videos of All Time", calling it a "funky" homage to Flashdance that "J-Lo in several scenes from the classic flick, dancing like her life depended on it". Jensen also wrote, "The video would earn a spot on this list just for the bit where water pours down from the ceiling on Lopez, but luckily the rest of the clip keeps the quality high." Joe Usmar of the Daily Mirror regarded it as one of the "10 Sexiest Music Videos Ever Made", praising Lopez's physicality and calling its visuals "goddamn hawt".

Author Daniel Bernardi noted that "While [Jennifer] Beals' performance was criticized for its lack of dance, Lopez's bodily performance faced scrutiny for its excess." In the book Dance and the Hollywood Latina: Race, Sex, and Stardom (2011), author Priscilla Peña Ovalle observed that the music video's provocative sexual choreography "authenticated [Lopez] as a bona fide Hollywood Latina by showing her dancing in shots that tilt from face to fanny". Ovalle also wrote that the storyline of Flashdance was similar to Lopez's life, and she fully embodied a "fantasy of achievement". Similarly, Gary Susman of Time wrote: "In a way, of course, Lopez was re-enacting her own life story, that of the Bronx girl who’d used street moves to dance her way to fame. Unlike Flashdance, 'I’m Glad' starred a woman who could perform her own dance moves." The video was nominated for four 2003 MTV Video Music Awards, including Best Female Video, Best Dance Video, Best Choreography in a Video and Best Art Direction in a Video.

=== Lawsuits ===
The recreation of dance sequences from Flashdance led the film's production company, Paramount Pictures, to sue Lopez and Sony Music over copyright infringement claims. A spokesperson for Lopez said that the film is one of Lopez's favorite movies, and that clip was nothing but a tribute to it. Paramount and Sony settled out of court. Apart from this, Maureen Marder—whose life was the inspiration for Flashdance—sued Lopez and Sony for copyright infringement in November 2003. Additionally, Marder had previously also sued Paramount for only paying her a $2,300 fee for her story, which the film adaption of grossed over $150 million at the United States box office. Marder "had refused to grant sequel rights or to permit any further use of her story or identity after the film became a success" according to her attorney, Robert Hefling. Hefling stated, "She is penniless, disabled with a spinal injury, and trying to raise a teenage daughter. Now her life story is on the screen again—and other people are profiting from it—with no acknowledgment of her rights, let alone fair compensation for her contribution." In June 2006, all of Marder's claims were dismissed.

== Live performances ==
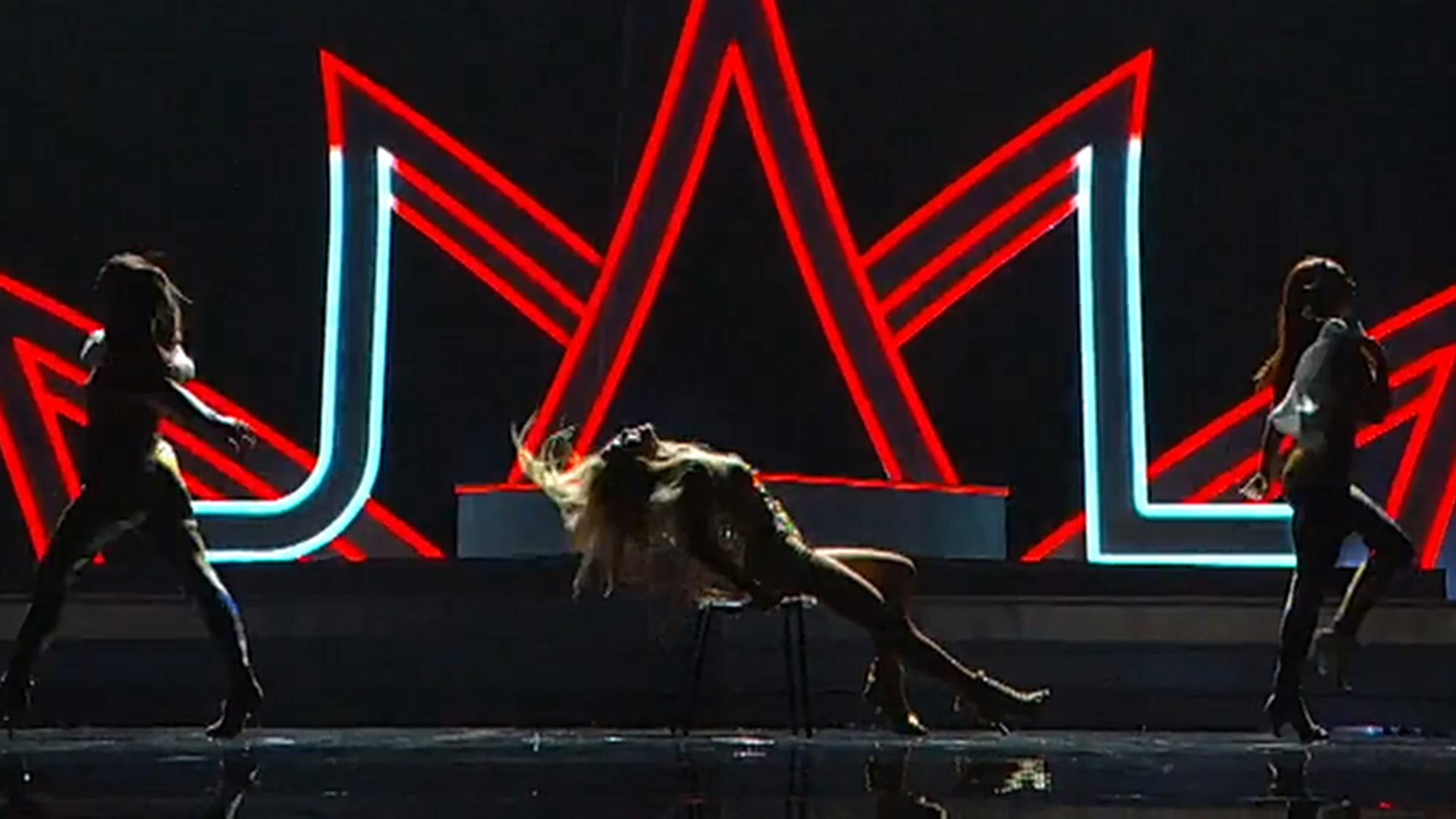
Lopez performing "I'm Glad" during her Video Vanguard set at the 2018 MTV Video Music Awards

During the song's initial release Lopez did not perform the song live at any moment in time until her performance at the 2018 MTV Video Music Awards in 2018 where she performed a small section of the song in her 10 minute long medley including recreating the video moment in which a bucket of water is splashed onto her from above while dancing (a hologram light replacing the water during the performance). Lopez included "I’m Glad" on her set list for the 2021 Global Citizen Live Festival. "I'm Glad" was also performed during Lopez's Apple Music Live concert in 2024, where she promoted the album This Is Me...Now (2024).

== Track listings ==
- US CD single
1. "I'm Glad" (album version) – 3:42
2. "I'm Glad" (Paul Oakenfold's Perfecto remix) – 5:46
- US 12-inch single

A1. "I'm Glad" (Paul Oakenfold Perfecto remix) – 5:46
A2. "I'm Glad" (J-Lo vs. Who Da Funk main mix) – 7:21
B1. "I'm Glad" (Ford's Siren club mix) – 5:28
B2. "I'm Glad" (Murk Miami mix) – 8:00

- US DVD single
1. "I'm Glad" (video)
2. "All I Have" (featuring LL Cool J—video)
- European CD single
1. "I'm Glad" – 3:42
2. "I'm Glad" (Paul Oakenfold's Perfecto remix) – 5:46
3. "I'm Glad" (video) 4:27
- UK CD single (The Club Remixes)
1. "I'm Glad" (album version) – 3:42
2. "I'm Glad" (Ford's Siren club mix radio edit) – 3:23
3. "I'm Glad" (Murk Miami mix radio edit) – 3:39
4. "I'm Glad" (J-Lo vs. Who Da Funk main mix) – 7:21
- UK cassette single
1. "I'm Glad" (album version) – 3:42
2. "I'm Glad" (Big Brovaz remix) – 3:42
3. "I'm Glad" (album version) – 3:42
4. "I'm Glad" (Big Brovaz remix) – 3:42
- UK DVD single
1. "I'm Glad" (extended video version)
2. "I'm Glad" (Big Brovaz remix) – 3:42
3. "I'm Glad" (Paul Oakenfold Perfecto remix) – 5:46
4. "2 Minutes of Edited Footage from Behind the Scenes" (video)
- Australian CD1
1. "I'm Glad" (album version) – 3:42
2. "I'm Glad" (Paul Oakenfold Perfecto remix) – 5:46
3. "I'm Glad" (Ford's Siren club mix) – 5:28
4. "All I Have" (Ignorants remix featuring LL Cool J)
- Australian CD2
1. "I'm Glad" (album version) – 3:42
2. "I'm Glad" (J-Lo vs. Who Da Funk main mix) – 7:21
3. "I'm Glad" (Murk Miami mix) – 8:00
4. "I'm Glad" (video version) – 4:27

== Charts ==
=== Weekly charts ===
Chart (2003)	Peak position
Australia (ARIA)	10
Australian Urban (ARIA)	4
Austria (Ö3 Austria Top 40)	50
Belgium (Ultratop 50 Flanders)	30
Belgium (Ultratop 50 Wallonia)	31
Canada (Nielsen SoundScan)	8
Europe (European Hot 100 Singles)	23
Germany (GfK)	44
Hungary (Rádiós Top 40)	37
Ireland (IRMA)	19
Italy (FIMI)	17
Netherlands (Dutch Top 40)	6
Netherlands (Single Top 100)	17
New Zealand (Recorded Music NZ)	22
Romania (Romanian Top 100)	73
Scottish Singles Sales (Official Charts)	21
Spain (Promusicae)	19
Sweden (Sverigetopplistan)	44
Switzerland (Schweizer Hitparade)	12
UK Singles (Official Charts)	11
UK Hip Hop/R&B (Official Charts)	5
US Billboard Hot 100	32
US Dance Club Songs (Billboard); Remixes	4
US Dance Singles Sales (Billboard); Remixes	2
US Hot R&B/Hip-Hop Songs (Billboard)	19
US Pop Airplay (Billboard)	13
US Rhythmic Airplay (Billboard)	13

=== Year-end charts ===
Chart (2003)	Position
Brazil (Crowley)	46
Netherlands (Dutch Top 40)	86
US Dance Singles Sales (Billboard)	12
US Mainstream Top 40 (Billboard)	76
US Rhythmic Top 40 (Billboard)	87

Chart (2004)	Position
US Dance Singles Sales (Billboard)	19

== Certifications ==
Region	Certification	Certified units/sales
Australia (ARIA)	Gold	35,000^{^}
^{^} Shipments figures based on certification alone.

== Release history ==
Release dates and formats for "I'm Glad"
Region	Date	Format(s)	Label	Ref.
United States	April 7, 2003	Contemporary hit radio; rhythmic contemporary radio	Epic	
Germany	May 26, 2003	CD single	Sony	
United Kingdom	June 9, 2003	CD single; DVD single; cassette single	Sony	
Canada	June 10, 2003	CD single	Epic	
Australia	June 23, 2003	CD single	Sony	

== Bibliography ==
- Ovalle, Priscilla Peña (2011). Dance and the Hollywood Latina: Race, Sex, and Stardom. Rutgers University Press. ISBN 978-0813548807.
- Bernardi, Daniel (2013). The Persistence of Whiteness: Race and Contemporary Hollywood Cinema. Routledge. ISBN 978-1135976446.
