= Baby I Love U! =

2003 single by Jennifer Lopez

Single by Jennifer Lopez

from the album This Is Me... Then
- Released: August 4, 2003
- Studio: The Hit Factory (New York City)
- Length: 4:31
- Label: Epic
- Songwriters: Jennifer Lopez; Cory Rooney; Dan Shea; John Barry
- Producers: Cory Rooney; Dan Shea

Jennifer Lopez singles chronology
"I'm Glad" (2003)	"Baby I Love U!" (2003)	"Get Right" (2005)

Music video
- "Baby I Love U!" on YouTube

"Baby I Love U!" (stylized as "Baby I ♡ U!") is a song recorded by American singer Jennifer Lopez for her third studio album, This Is Me... Then (2002). It was written by Lopez, Cory Rooney, Dan Shea and John Barry and produced by Rooney and Shea. The song contains an interpolation of the theme for the film Midnight Cowboy (1969), which was well-received by music critics, who agreed it was used with care.

"Baby I Love U" is about unconditional love, with critics pointing out that it was inspired by her relationship with the actor Ben Affleck. Lopez would also meaningfully quote some of the lyrics from the song several times throughout her memoir, True Love. Commercially, the song was as successful as the other singles from the album in the United Kingdom, where it peaked at number three. In the United States, the song peaked at number 72 on the Billboard Hot 100, and reached the top 30 of the Mainstream Top 40 chart.

== Background and release ==
While recording her then-upcoming album, Lopez listened to blues and soul, the music she had often turned to while growing up. Using songs by Stevie Wonder, Luther Vandross and others as inspiration, she attempted to elicit a similar feeling in her own songwriting, claiming, "Those were just songs that made my heart sing", she said. "They just stay with you. ... I wanted to do something that's true to me and how I grew up, but I also wanted to make beautiful songs. So I'd listen to records from today and I would listen to records from back then, and [eventually] I'd go, 'That's what I want.'"

Among the songs on the album, "Baby I Love U!" was written, with the help of her longtime collaborator and friend Cory Rooney. "He's so talented", she said. "And he's so 'behind the scenes,' especially when it comes to me. He's really, really just dedicated to music for the pure love of music." "Baby I Love U!" was released as the album's fourth and final single on August 3, 2003, in the United States, and on March 8, 2004, in the United Kingdom. A remix version featuring R. Kelly was released on the CD single of the song. Kelly's part talks about 'rollin' with 'some fine females' against J-Lo's heart-on-the-sleeve declaration of passion. The version with Kelly was also included on her second remix album "The Reel Me".

== Composition and lyrics ==
"Baby I Love U!" was written by Jennifer Lopez, Cory Rooney and Dan Shea, with production being handled by Rooney and Shea. The song contains an interpolation of the "haunting melody" from the theme of Midnight Cowboy, written by John Barry. The track has a "vintage-sound", where Lopez "gushes for Ben Affleck", according to Sal Cinquemani of Slant Magazine. Lyrically, Baby, I Love U" talks about being a hopeless romantic, with Lopez singing: "What I wanna know is/ Are you willing to try?/ Can you love me for a lifetime/ In just one night?."

== Critical reception ==
"Baby, I Love U" was well-received by music critics. Betty Clarke of The Guardian praised the sample usage, which according to her, was used with care. Tom Sinclair of Entertainment Weekly also commended the sample, saying that "the girl has a way with hooks, even if they're often borrowed," citing the "Midnight Cowboy" sample as an example. James Dinh of MTV News agreed, applauding Lopez for " turn[ing] the somber music of John Barry's 1969 "Midnight Cowboy" score into a blissful (and kind of cheesy)." Quentin Harrison, in his 20th year anniversary review of the album for Albumism, was very positive, noting that "groove and melody lead the beat without totally abandoning it [...], which gives the LP a sophisticated feel rather than an austere one."

== Commercial performance ==
Prior to the single's release, MSN launched a new music premiere program, exclusively premiering the song, which generated over a million downloads of the track between November 21, 2002 and December 15, 2002. Later, while released as a single, "Baby I Love U!" performed much lower than Lopez's previous singles from This Is Me... Then in the United States, missing the top 40 on the Billboard Hot 100 chart, debuting and peaking at number 72, on the issue date April 3, 2004. Eventually, the song became Lopez's lowest charting-English single on the Billboard charts, until "Papi" became her lowest charting-single, later in 2011. The song also made its debut on the Hot R&B/Hip-Hop Songs chart at number 75. The song received a Billboard Spin Award on March 25, 2006, for 50,000 spins. Elsewhere, the song proved to be more successful. In the United Kingdom, the song was a huge success, debuting and peaking at number three, on March 20, 2004, becoming her third top-three single of the same album. In Ireland, the single managed to peak inside the top 20, reaching number 16, on March 11, 2004.

== Music video and live performances ==
The music video for the song was directed by Meiert Avis and premiered on BET, on August 11, 2003. The video was also included on the DVD The Reel Me. It features scenes of Lopez in bed, as well as walking around the house, performing the song. Jason Shawhan of About.com called the video "minimalist and stark and much more inspired than the song that forms its spine." Shawhan continued, "Visually, in fact, there's something quite experimental going on with its almost exclusive use of close-up and shifting focal length. This is certainly a promising development in Lopez' continuing evolution as a visual artist, and we can hope she'll work with director Meiert Avis again soon." There is a version of the music video featuring scenes from the movie Gigli released on MTV.

The bed sequence of the music video has a link to a later Lopez music video, Marry Me (Ballad Version), as both music videos have a bed sequence. In "Baby I Love U!" she is alone in bed and looking at the camera, but in Marry Me (Ballad Version) she is seen in bed alongside Ben Affleck. Lopez performed the song for the first time on Telman Ismailov's 50 years anniversary as a birthday gift i 2006. It was later included as an interlude on her Dance Again World Tour (2012).

== Track listing ==
- CD single
1. "Baby I Love U!" (album version) – 4:31
2. "Baby I Love U!" (R. Kelly remix) – 4:13
3. "Baby I Love U!" (video) – 4:30
- 12-inch single

A. "Baby I Love U!" (album version) – 4:31
B. "Baby I Love U!" (R. Kelly remix) – 4:13

== Charts ==
=== Weekly charts ===
Chart (2003–2004)	Peak position
Europe (Eurochart Hot 100)	12
Ireland (IRMA)	16
Romania (Romanian Top 100)	14
Scottish Singles Sales (Official Charts)	7
UK Singles (Official Charts)	3
UK Hip Hop/R&B (Official Charts)	1
US Billboard Hot 100	72
US Hot R&B/Hip-Hop Songs (Billboard)	55
US Pop Airplay (Billboard)	26
US Rhythmic Airplay (Billboard)	15

=== Year-end charts ===
Chart (2004)	Position
UK Singles (OCC)	65
US Rhythmic Top 40 (Billboard)	79

== Release history ==
Region	Date	Format	Label	Ref.
United States	August 4, 2003	Contemporary hit radio	Epic	
United States	September 22, 2003	Hot adult contemporary radio	Epic	
United Kingdom	March 8, 2004	CD single	Epic	
United States	March 8, 2004	Urban radio	Epic	
