= This Is Me... Then =

Studio album by Jennifer Lopez
- Released: November 25, 2002
- Recorded: 2001–2002
- Studios: The Hit Factory (New York, NY); The Studio (Philadelphia, PA); Criteria Studios (Miami, FL); Sony Music Studios (New York, NY); Lobo Recording Studios (Long Island, NY); Record Plant (Los Angeles, CA)
- Genres: Hip hop; soul; R&B
- Length: 47:15
- Label: Epic
- Producers: Davy Deluge; Focus...; Ron G; Reggie Hamlet; Loren Hill; Jennifer Lopez; Dave McPherson; Troy Oliver; Poke and Tone; Cory Rooney; Dan Shea; Rich Shelton; Kevin Veney

Jennifer Lopez chronology
J to tha L–O! The Remixes (2002)	This Is Me... Then (2002)	The Reel Me (2003)

Singles from This Is Me... Then
- 1. "Jenny from the Block" Released: September 26, 2002; 2. "All I Have" Released: December 14, 2002; 3. "I'm Glad" Released: April 8, 2003; 4. "Baby I Love U!" Released: August 4, 2003

This Is Me... Then is the third studio album by American singer Jennifer Lopez. It was released on November 25, 2002, by Epic Records. Prior to its release, Lopez began a high-profile relationship with Ben Affleck and a media circus ensued. Her relationship with Affleck served as her main inspiration for the album, which is dedicated to him. Initially scheduled to be released the following year, This Is Me... Then's release date was quickly pushed forward after its lead single, "Jenny from the Block", was purposely leaked by Tommy Mottola, the head of Sony Music Entertainment.

For the album's recording, Lopez once again recruited Cory Rooney, Troy Oliver and Dan Shea, all of whom she had worked with on her previous albums. She decided to shift away from a dance-pop to more of an R&B and soul sound, influenced by the soul music she grew up listening to. The record's throwback material was integrated with mainstream hip hop and pop music. During its production, Lopez was influenced by the works of Michael Jackson, Luther Vandross and Stevie Wonder among others.

This Is Me... Then received mixed reviews from music critics. Some praised its musical direction, deeming it her strongest album to date, whilst others criticized its production and Lopez's vocal performance. The album went on to achieve commercial success, reaching number two in the United States where it has sold 2.6 million copies. It also reached the top ten in countries such as Canada, France, Germany, Japan, the Netherlands, Sweden, and Switzerland, selling over 6 million copies worldwide.

The album's lead single, "Jenny from the Block" featuring Styles P and Jadakiss of The Lox, became an international success, peaking at three in the United States. However, its release was followed by the notoriety of its music video, which featured Affleck. The single has since been used as a nickname for Lopez in the media, known as one of her signature songs. The album's second single "All I Have" featuring rapper LL Cool J also achieved commercial success, becoming her fourth number-one single in the United States. "I'm Glad", the third single, performed moderately. The single's music video was met with critical acclaim, but caused controversy for recreating scenes from the 1983 film Flashdance. Sony and Lopez were sued over this, but the lawsuit was dismissed. This Is Me... Then spawned a fourth single entitled "Baby I Love U!"

On November 25, 2022, which was the album's 20th anniversary, Lopez announced that she would be releasing a sequel album in 2024 titled This Is Me... Now.

== Background ==
In June 2002, Lopez split from her former back-up dancer Cris Judd to pursue a relationship with Academy Award winning actor and director, Ben Affleck, "Hollywood's Golden Boy". That November, Affleck proposed, resulting in a higher amount of attention towards the couple. The public and media began to refer to them as "Bennifer" and they became a prominent supercouple in the media and popular culture. "Bennifer" became a popular term, which was eventually entered into urban dictionaries and neologism dictionaries as notable, and the name blend started the trend of other celebrity couples being referred to by the combination of each other's first names.

Speaking of the publicity, Lopez told MTV News: "We try [to keep things private]." "I'm not saying there's not times that we wish [we] could just be going to the movies and come out and there's not a crowd there waiting. You just want to spend your Sunday afternoon not working, but at the same time we both love what we do. If that's something that's part of it, then that's fine. We feel the love and we're very happy about it," she stated. While speaking of the damage that could be caused, Lopez said: "I think [the media can cause damage] if it's not a real thing. I've been in relationships where they were kind of unstable, and so the media messed with it a lot." The overexposure from the media and public interest in their relationship resulted in less admiration for their work and negatively affected their careers.

== Writing and recording ==
Affleck became Lopez's muse when writing and recording the album. "I wrote a lot of songs inspired, in a way, by what I was going through at the time that this album was being made, and he was definitely a big part of that," she told MTV News. The singer took more of a "hands-on role", co-writing more material than she had on her previous albums. The album was titled This Is Me... Then, as it was something she wanted to look back on in retrospection. Lopez explained, "Who you are at that time, what kind of music you like, what kind of beats you're into, what kind of state of mind you're in, what you're attracted to ... it's all very telling of where you are in your life at that point. ... Twenty years from now, if I give this [album] to one of my kids, I'll be like, 'This was me then, at that moment.'" Lopez dedicated the album to Affleck, with the words "You are my life ... my sole inspiration for every lyric, every emotion, every bit of feeling on this record" written on the disc jacket. As of 2022, he remains the only man she has done this romantic gesture to.

Lopez wrote lyrics for the album in a small red leather diary, which she described as her "magic book". In it, she often scribbled down her thoughts and ideas. The album's artwork and liner notes were modeled after this book, which would "further the feel of an intimate portrait of Lopez's soul". "I wanted the pictures to look kind of aged, like it was a scrapbook. ... All the writing [in it] is all kinds of crazy and upside down and sideways just as it is in my book," Lopez stated. While creating the album, she listened to a vast range of blues and soul music, which she listened to growing up. Artists such as Stevie Wonder, Luther Vandross and Michael Jackson among other had a profound influence on the album's sound. According to Lopez, she attempts to "elicit a similar feeling" in her own songwriting from these artists' songs on the album, because they made her "heart sing". Vandross and Wonder's records "just stay with you" according to Lopez, who wanted to make something that was true to her upbringing as well as her current love life.

The majority of This Is Me... Then was recorded over two weeks. Lopez was drawn to the "contagious" melodies of Michael Jackson's album Off the Wall (1979), which led her to summon the record's mixer and engineer, Bruce Swedien, to work on This Is Me... Then. Lopez felt that Jackson's "clear and spacious" records made her feel a "certain way". She said, "It has such a beautiful quality on it, and every time I looked at a record [I liked], it would be engineered and mixed by Bruce Swedien. I was like, 'Who is this guy? I want this guy.' So I tracked him down and he was like, 'I want to do something with her. I know exactly what she needs. I'm coming in.' And it made a huge difference." Lopez worked closely with longtime producer Cory Rooney on the album. Discussing the process, Rooney stated, "This is by far the best record that I've ever worked on or done [...] In the beginning of the recording [process] she said it's important that she makes a record that is a few notches above everything else she did. She wanted to show growth musically and vocally." Other producers Lopez worked with primarily were Troy Oliver, Loren Hill and Dan Shea. She had previously collaborated with Oliver and Shea on J.Lo (2001).

Lopez has cited this album as her favorite album she has ever done many times over the years. Saying in part: "At that time I truly realized that being an artist meant you have to be vulnerable and bare your heart and soul...it takes courage to do that...to really show who you are at any given moment in time."

== Composition ==
"I love the hip-hop. I love the R&B. It's gonna manifest itself in my music. ... The soul of the record is based in my Bronx upbringing. I think that really shows here — that time when people were rocking in Lees and Adidas. ... This record has a little bit of that nostalgia in it, so it wasn't so much I was trying to get gritty or grimy or street — even though it has that element, which I think is cool — but it was more just really getting to who I was and letting that out."

— Lopez on the album's musical direction

This Is Me... Then was considered a departure from Lopez's previous work, with more of an adult-oriented contemporary R&B sound, which included multiple ballads. The Age newspaper described the album as a "declaration of love" for Ben Affleck. Boston Globe's Steve Morse wrote, "[the] love affair has fired up Hollywood and now pop listeners can now share the vibe. This is one hot album, as [Lopez] sings to lovers everywhere with a soulful passion that will quicken pulses and libidos." Entertainment Weekly described it as having a Minnie Riperton sound, while The Guardian noted the musical influence of Diana Ross and likened its sensuality to Marvin Gaye's Let's Get It On (1973). The album evokes 1970s soul music, and blends "streetwise" hip hop with "old-school soul".

"Still"
A twenty-five second sample of "Still", a song in which Lopez sings about having love for a former boyfriend; Sean Combs was speculated to be the person in question. The song was compared to early music by Deniece Williams.

The album's opening song, "Still" is built around a sample from Teddy Pendergrass' "Set Me Free", and its lyrics concern an ex-lover. Entertainment Weekly observed that it may be about Lopez's ex-boyfriend Sean Combs, with lyrics such as "Do you ever wish we never split?" The song was likened to the music of Deniece Williams. "Loving You" samples Mtume's "Juicy Fruit" and George Benson's "Never Give Up on a Good Thing", while the ballad "I'm Glad" incorporates a part of Schooly D's "P.S.K. What Does It Mean?". The instrumentation of "I'm Glad" consists of a piano, guitar and classical harp runs, which are laced throughout a computer-generated beat. In "I'm Glad", Lopez discusses finding true love, and declares "I think I'm in love/Damn, finally!" Two versions of the song "The One" are featured on the album. The first version, which is the fourth track on the album, is based around "You Are Everything" by The Stylistics.

"Dear Ben", originally titled "Perfect", opens to an "atmosphere of lush strings and sparse percussion", described as a "starry-eyed paean to fiancé Ben Affleck". It contains lyrics which detail the characteristics of Lopez's perfect man, such as "You will always be ... To me, my lust, my love, my man, my child, my friend and my king" and "God made you for me". "Dear Ben" was considered a profession of Lopez's love for Affleck to the media, and has been described as the album's "glowing centerpiece". Lopez made the decision to change the song's title to "Dear Ben" the day before This Is Me... Then was sent for manufacturing. "All I Have", a duet with LL Cool J which samples Debra Law's "Very Special", is a breakup song, and has been noted to conjure up her publicized split with Combs. "Jenny from the Block" features lyrics about Lopez remaining humble despite fame and fortune. It samples several songs, including "Hijack" by Enoch Light and KRS-One's "South Bronx". The Age wrote that the song intones Lopez's "modest childhood roots, vowing she wishes to remain simple despite her diamonds", while MTV said that she finds "the middle ground between Hollywood A-Lister and Big Apple B-Girl" on the "club-banging" song. In the ballad "Again", Lopez considers finding love again; "I was scared to let go and trust your love," she sings in the second verse. The theme of Lopez's relationship with Affleck is also evident in the vintage-sounding mid-tempo song "Baby I Love U!", which features a guitar and piano instrumentation that includes a "haunting" interpolation from the theme of the film Midnight Cowboy (1969). The song, described as "cheesy" and "blissful", has Lopez singing about being a hopeless romantic ("Can you love me for a lifetime/ In just one night?"). The album closes with a second version of "The One"; this version contains a slightly different production and a new verse was written in place of the original. The lyrical content remains the same. Both the album and song end with Lopez singing "I can be anything you need", like in the original, except silence is heard after that line is said.

== Singles ==
"Jenny from the Block" (2002)
A 19-second sample consisting of the chorus from the album's lead single "Jenny from the Block", in which Lopez professes "No matter where I go, I know where I came from."

On September 26, 2002, a song entitled "Jenny from the Block" by Lopez featuring Styles P and Jadakiss of The LOX was leaked online. A pop radio station in Hartford, Connecticut, later picked up the song from the internet. "Jenny from the Block" was then immediately distributed to other stations owned by Infinity Broadcasting as the album's lead single. Cory Rooney later revealed in 2016 that it was Sony Music executive Tommy Mottola who leaked the song. Rooney and Lopez initially wanted a song titled "Glad" to be the album's lead single, but Mottola favored "Jenny from the Block". Rooney recalled: "When we played 'Jenny from the Block,' he said, 'This is your single.' So right away we both were like no no no that’s not the single. He told us, 'You guys are crazy. This is the single I don’t give a shit what you say you’re gonna destroy the album if you don’t listen to me.'" According to Rooney, Mottola leaked the single the following day without their knowledge, noting: "He pulled the trigger and all over the world they were playing that record that day." "Jenny from the Block" went on to experience international commercial success, peaking within the top ten in the United States as well as over twelve other countries. An accompanying music video for the song, directed by Francis Lawrence and featuring Affleck, was released. According to The Spectator, "Before celebrities become stars, they dream about gaining fame, fortune, and being in the spotlight [...] The video is basically about how she cannot find privacy with her fiance Ben Affleck. A lot of glamour is associated with fame and fortune; however, along with that glamour comes the loss of privacy". The music video became one of the most controversial ones in pop culture at the time. Considered "the video that killed Ben Affleck's career", the actor stated, years after his engagement to Lopez ended, that he regretted filming it.

On December 14, 2002; "All I Have" featuring rapper LL Cool J was released as the second single from This Is Me... Then. Not only did it become the album's second consecutive top-ten single in the United States, "All I Have" became Lopez's fourth song to top the Billboard Hot 100. The song also performed well internationally, ranking within the top ten of numerous charts. The song samples the 1981 track "Very Special" by Debra Laws. Laws later filed a lawsuit in 2003 against Lopez, LL Cool J and Sony Music Entertainment for "misappropriating her voice and name" in the song. More than three years later, the district court discovered that Law's music label had given Sony permission to use a 10-second sample of Law's song. The lawsuit was dropped, and Laws was advised to sue her own label and publisher for "breach of contract for entering a license agreement without her authorization". According to Lopez, she initially didn't want "Jenny from the Block" or "All I Have" to be released as singles from the album. She felt that the tracks were too similar to her previous singles such as "Ain't It Funny" and "I'm Real"; she felt like she was "visiting old territory". "Those tracks were like a different era for me, and I didn't want people to perceive it like I'm just trying to capitalize on the same thing. But the record company was like, 'Who cares what they think, those are hits mama!'". Lopez, who stated she "calls the shots", eventually agreed.

On April 8, 2003, "I'm Glad" was released as the album's third single. Unlike its predecessors, "I'm Glad" failed to enter the top ten in the United States, while performing moderately in the international market. Its accompanying music video was a remake of the 1983 film Flashdance which was based on Maureen Marder's life, who was a "construction worker by day and dancer by night". The music video, described as a "homage" to the film, impressed the filmmakers and they began talks with Lopez about creating a re-make. However, Paramount Pictures threatened to sue Sony over copyright issues. A representative for Epic Records confirmed that this issue was settled. Marder also filed a lawsuit against Sony and Lopez which was quickly dismissed by the courts. That August, "Baby I Love U" was released as the album's fourth and final single, but failed to gain notable chart recognition.

== Promotion ==
Upon its initial release, 200,000 copies of This Is Me... Then included a four-panel insert that featured information about her fragrance Glow by JLo, and a peel-off fragrance label that allowed those who purchased the CD to test the scent. On September 27, 2002, a spokesperson for Lopez revealed that she planned to take a break from acting to launch a tour in support of This Is Me... Then in April 2003. However, in late July 2003, Lopez clarified that these plans had been canceled.

== Critical reception ==
Professional ratings
Aggregate scores
Source	Rating
Metacritic	52/100
Review scores
Source	Rating
AllMusic	4/5 stars
Dotmusic	7/10
Entertainment Weekly	B
The Guardian	4/5 stars
The Independent	2/5 stars
Now	2/5 Ns
Q	2/5 stars
Rolling Stone	2/5 stars
Rolling Stone Album Guide	2.5/5 stars
Slant Magazine	3.5/5 stars
Stylus	F

According to the reviewer aggregator Metacritic, which sampled nine reviews of This Is Me... Then, the album garnered mostly "mixed or average" reviews from music critics. Writing for Billboard magazine, Michael Paoletta gave the album a favorable review, stating that "even naysayers will have to serve props to Lopez for the considerable growth she reveals as both a performer and tune-smith." Allmusic's Stephen Thomas Erlewine also praised the album, describing it as "sexy, stylish, and fun" and calling it the "strongest, sultriest, best music [Lopez] has recorded." Tom Sinclair of Entertainment Weekly praised Lopez's ability with hooks and said listeners were "seduced by the breezy pleasure of her new music." Yahoo! Music's James Poletti similarly praised the album's "honeyed backing." The Guardian critic Betty Clarke called the music "sublime," highlighting Lopez's shift toward "1970s soul" and praising her "restraint and taste" in adopting the new direction. Slant Magazine's Sal Cinquemani stated that This Is Me...Then "manages to find the right formula for Lopez's slinky vocal" and is "more unified than its predecessors," adding that Lopez would "no doubt earn a grain of respect from critics."

Other critics were less favorable. Hot Press critic Stephen Robinson described This Is Me... Then as a "schizophrenic offering," arguing that its shift toward soulful and disco-influenced material might alienate Lopez's existing pop audience without establishing her as a diva. He praised its "sumptuous production values" and New York hip-hop influences, but criticized the album's derivative songwriting, calling "The One" a "carbon-copy" and "Jenny From the Block" a possible Destiny's Child outtake. Arion Berger of Rolling Stone criticized the songs as being "pitched too high for her register" and described the production as "cheap," adding that "love has dulled whatever street edge she might have had." Similarly, The Village Voice's Jon Caramanica was similarly unfavorable, describing the album as "awkward, unwanted, and blindly self-righteous." New York Post critic Dan Aquilante criticized the album for lacking the "Latin soul" of Lopez's earlier work and relying on generic pop grooves, although he praised "Jenny From the Block" as "infectious" and "I'm Glad" for its "wonderful Latin undercurrent." Now's Tim Perlich criticized its repetitive love songs about Affleck and Lopez's "same sing/rap style." Stylus critic Sam Bloch gave This Is Me... Then an F, calling it "carelessly generic and unoriginal" and "tired-sounding." He criticized its repetitive ballads and Lopez's "whiney, timid" vocals, while praising "Jenny From the Block" and "You Belong to Me" as highlights before ultimately describing the album as "languid, lifeless, and generic.

== Commercial performance ==
This Is Me... Then was a commercial success, although not as successful as J.Lo. Released on November 26, 2002, the album debuted on the Billboard 200 at number six, with first-week sales of 314,132 in the United States. This marked the highest opening sales week of Lopez's career. Rolling Stone noted that despite this, "unlike her previous releases, the field wasn't empty for this album to dominate". In its second week, it dropped to number seven with 171,000 copies sold. Throughout December, the album remained in the chart's top ten, and was later ranked by the magazine as the twelfth most successful album of 2003. It sold 1.28 million copies within a month of release. For the chart issue January 4, 2003, This Is Me... Then sold 345,150 copies, moving from number eight to number five as a result of holiday season gains. For the issue of January 11, 2003, the album remained at number five of the Billboard 200, selling 233,275 copies.

For the issue of January 25, 2003, This Is Me... Then made its biggest jump on the Billboard 200, climbing from number six to number two, with sales of 88,625 units, blocked from reaching the top spot by Norah Jones' Come Away With Me (2002) which sold 108,000 copies. Throughout February 2003, the album continued to perform strongly, averaging close to 80,000 copies sold each week, while remaining in the top ten. Additionally, the album peaked at number five on Billboard's Top R&B/Hip-Hop Albums chart. By June 2013, This Is Me... Then had sold 2.6 million copies in the United States, making it her third best-selling album.

Internationally, the album entered the top ten of most countries. In Australia, the album debuted and peaked at number 14 on the ARIA Charts for the week ending December 8, 2002. Commercially, it became one of her lowest-charting albums there. However, This Is Me... Then remained on the ARIA Charts until July 6, 2003, allowing it to be certified platinum by the Australian Recording Industry Association for shipments of over 70,000 units. In the United Kingdom, the album peaked at number 13, selling 47,000 copies in its first week. This was eleven positions lower than her previous album, J.Lo. It was eventually certified double platinum by the British Phonographic Industry in July 2013, marking shipments of over 600,000 copies. This Is Me... Then peaked at number five in Canada, and fell to number eight the following week with sales of 17,900. In total, the album has sold over 200,000 copies in Canada, earning a double platinum status in March 2006. In France, it debuted and peaked at number four for the week ending November 30, 2002. After re-entering the French Albums Chart on multiple occasions, it made its final appearance on August 1, 2004, at number 179. The Syndicat National de l'Édition Phonographique certified This Is Me... Then 2x gold for shipments of 220,000 units. The album peaked at number four in Germany and was certified Gold by the International Federation of the Phonographic Industry for shipments of 150,000 units. In Greece, the album peaked at number one and was certified Gold there for sales of 15,000 copies in 2003. Additionally, it peaked at number 10 in Finland, and has sold 19,998 copies there. This Is Me... Then has sold over 6 million copies worldwide.

== Track listing ==
This Is Me... Then – Standard edition
No.	Title	Writer(s)	Producer(s)	Length
1.	"Still"	Jennifer Lopez; Rich Shelton; Kevin Veney; Loren Hill; Leonard Huggins; LeRoy Bell; Casey James	Shelton; Veney; Hill; Cory Rooney	3:40
2.	"Loving You"	Troy Oliver; Rooney; James Mtume; Michael Garvin; Tom C. Shapiro	T. Oliver; Rooney	3:45
3.	"I'm Glad"	Lopez; T. Oliver; Rooney; Mr. Deyo; Jesse Weaver Jr.	T. Oliver; Rooney	3:42
4.	"The One"	Lopez; Rooney; Davy Deluge; Linda Creed; Thom Bell	Rooney; Deluge; Dan Shea	3:36
5.	"Dear Ben"	Lopez; Rooney; Bernard Edwards Jr.	Focus...; Rooney	3:14
6.	"All I Have" (featuring LL Cool J)	Lopez; Makeba Riddick; Curtis Richardson; Ron G; Lisa Peters; William Jeffrey	Rooney; Ron G; Dave McPherson	4:14
7.	"Jenny from the Block" (featuring Styles P and Jadakiss)	Lopez; T. Oliver; Mr. Deyo; Samuel Barnes; Jean Claude Olivier; Jose Fernando Arbex Miro; Lawrence Parker; Scott Sterling; Michael Oliver; David Styles; Jason Phillips	T. Oliver; Rooney; Poke and Tone	3:07
8.	"Again"	Lopez; Rooney; T. Oliver; Reggie Hamlet	T. Oliver; Hamlet; Rooney	5:47
9.	"You Belong to Me"	Carly Simon; Michael McDonald	Rooney; Shea	3:30
10.	"I've Been Thinkin'"	Lopez; Rooney; Shea	Rooney; Shea	4:41
11.	"Baby I Love U!"	Lopez; Rooney; Shea; John Barry	Rooney; Shea	4:28
12.	"The One" (version 2; bonus track)	Lopez; Rooney; Creed; Deluge; Bell	Rooney; Deluge; Shea	3:31
Total length:				47:15

This Is Me... Then – International edition (bonus track) / Limited edition (Disc 1) / Japan Version
No.	Title	Writer(s)	Producer(s)	Length
13.	"I'm Gonna Be Alright" (Trackmasters Remix featuring Nas)	Lopez; Rooney; T. Oliver; Lorraine Cheryl Cook; Ronald LaPread; Olivier; Barnes	Rooney; T. Oliver; Poke and Tone	2:52
Total length:				50:07

This Is Me... Then – Brazilian edition (bonus track)
No.	Title	Writer(s)	Producer(s)	Length
13.	"Jenny from the Block" (Bronx Remix – Edit)	Lopez; T. Oliver; Mr. Deyo; Barnes; Olivier; Miro; Parker; Sterling; M. Oliver	T. Oliver; Rooney; Poke and Tone	2:49
Total length:				50:04

This Is Me... Then – Digital 20th anniversary edition
No.	Title	Writer(s)	Producer(s)	Length
13.	"I'm Glad" (Paul Oakenfold Perfecto Remix)	Lopez; T. Oliver; Rooney; Mr. Deyo	T. Oliver; Rooney; Paul Oakenfold^{[a]}	5:47
14.	"Jenny from the Block" (Everbots Showtime Radio Edit)	Lopez; T. Oliver; Mr. Deyo; Barnes; Olivier; Miro; Parker; Sterling; M. Oliver	T. Oliver; Rooney; Poke and Toke; Everbots^{[a]}^{[b]}	3:43
15.	"The One" (Bastone & Burnz Radio Mix)	Lopez; Rooney; Deluge; Creed; Bell	Rooney; Deluge; Shea; Freddy Bastone^{[a]}; Jeffrey Bernstein^{[a]}	3:47
16.	"All I Have" (featuring LL Cool J; Ignorants Remix)	Lopez; Smith; Riddick; Richardson; Ron G; McPherson; Peters; Jeffrey	Rooney; Ron G; McPherson; Ignorants^{[a]}; Marshall & Trell^{[a]}^{[b]}	4:03
Total length:				64:15

This Is Me... Then – Limited edition (Disc 2)
No.	Title	Writer(s)	Producer(s)	Length
1.	"Jenny from the Block" (Seismic Crew's Latin Disco Trip)	Lopez; T. Oliver; Mr. Deyo; Barnes; Olivier; Miro; Parker; Sterling; M. Oliver	T. Oliver; Rooney; Poke and Toke; Seismic Crew^{[a]}^{[b]}	6:41
2.	"All I Have" (featuring LL Cool J; Ignorants Remix)	Lopez; Smith; Riddick; Richardson; Ron G; McPherson; Peters; Jeffrey	Rooney; Ron G; McPherson; Ignorants^{[a]}; Marshall & Trell^{[a]}^{[b]}	4:03
3.	"I'm Glad" (Paul Oakenfold Perfecto Remix)	Lopez; T. Oliver; Rooney; Mr. Deyo	T. Oliver; Rooney; Paul Oakenfold^{[a]}	5:47
4.	"The One" (Bastone & Burnz Club Mix)	Lopez; Rooney; Deluge; Creed; Bell	Rooney; Deluge; Shea; Freddy Bastone^{[a]}; Jeffrey Bernstein^{[a]}	7:40
5.	"Baby I Love U!" (R. Kelly Remix)	Lopez; Rooney; Shea; Barry; R. Kelly	Rooney; Shea; Kelly^{[a]}	4:11
Total length:				28:22

Notes

- ^{^[a]} signifies a remixer.
- ^{^[b]} signifies an additional producer.
- The main album version of "Jenny from the Block" is subtitled as the "Track Masters remix" on digital platforms.
- "Still" contains elements of "Set Me Free", written by LeRoy Bell and Casey James and performed by Teddy Pendergrass.
- "Loving You" contains:
  - a portion of "Juicy Fruit", written by James Mtume and performed by Mtume.
  - an interpolation of "Never Give Up on a Good Thing", written by Michael Garvin and Tom C. Shapiro and performed by George Benson.
- "I'm Glad" contains a sample of "P.S.K. What Does It Mean?", written and performed by Jesse "Schoolly D" Weaver Jr.
- "The One" and "The One (Version 2)" contain an interpolation of "You Are Everything", written by Thom Bell and Linda Creed and performed by The Stylistics.
- "All I Have" contains a sample and interpolation of "Very Special", written by Lisa Peters and William Jeffrey and performed by Debra Laws.
- "Jenny from the Block" contains:
  - an interpolation of "Hi-Jack" (1975), written by Jose Fernando Arbex Miro.
  - a portion of "South Bronx" (1987), written by Lawrence Parker and Scott Sterling.
  - portions of "Heaven and Hell Is on Earth" (1975), written by Michael Oliver.
- "You Belong to Me" contains a sample of "Catch the Beat", written by G. Andrews, K. Nix, Brad Osborne, T. Ski Valley and performed by T. Ski Valley.
- "Baby I Love U!" contains an interpolation of "Midnight Cowboy" (1969), written and performed by John Barry.

== Personnel ==
Musicians

- Jennifer Lopez – vocals
- Omar Hakim – drums (tracks 1, 4, 9–12)
- Verdine White – bass guitar (tracks 1, 4, 10–12)
- Larry Gold – conductor, performance arrangement (tracks 1, 4, 5, 10)
- LaKindra Pierce – vocals (track 1)
- One Up Entertainment – programming (track 1)
- Natasha Ramos – vocals (tracks 2–4, 7, 11)
- Troy Oliver – drum programming, programming (tracks 2, 7, 8)
- Dan Shea – programming (tracks 4, 10–12), keyboards (4, 10, 11); acoustic guitar, guitar (11)
- Shelene Thomas – vocals (tracks 4, 10–12)
- René Toledo – guitar (tracks 4, 10, 12)
- Cory Rooney – vocals (tracks 4, 11, 12)
- Billy Lawrence – vocals (track 4)
- Davy Deluge – keyboards, programming (track 4)
- Focus... – all instruments (track 5)
- Makeba Riddick – vocals (track 6)
- B-Money – scratches (track 7)
- Reggie Hamlet – acoustic guitar, bass guitar (track 8)
- Tavia Ivey – vocals (track 9)
- Reggie Hamilton – bass guitar (track 9)
- Kamil Rustam – electric guitar (track 9)

Technical

- Bruce Swedien – mixing (all tracks), engineering (tracks 1–6, 8–12)
- Peter Wade Keusch – mixing (all tracks), engineering (tracks 1–6, 8–12)
- Jean Marie Horvat – mixing (tracks 2, 3, 7)
- Jeff Chestek – engineering (tracks 1, 5)
- Rob Williams – engineering (track 6)
- Jon Kaplan – engineering (track 7)

== Charts ==
=== Weekly charts ===
Weekly chart performance for This Is Me... Then
Chart (2002–2003)	Peak position
Argentina Albums (CAPIF)	3
Australian Albums (ARIA)	14
Australian Urban Albums (ARIA)	3
Austrian Albums (Ö3 Austria)	7
Belgian Albums (Ultratop Flanders)	6
Belgian Albums (Ultratop Wallonia)	6
Canadian Albums (Billboard)	5
Canadian R&B Albums (Nielsen SoundScan)	1
Czech Albums (ČNS IFPI)	19
Danish Albums (Hitlisten)	13
Dutch Albums (Album Top 100)	7
European Albums (Music & Media)	3
Finnish Albums (Suomen virallinen lista)	10
French Albums (SNEP)	4
German Albums (Offizielle Top 100)	4
Greek Albums (IFPI)	1
Hungarian Albums (MAHASZ)	9
Icelandic Albums (Tónlist)	2
Irish Albums (IRMA)	15
Italian Albums (FIMI)	11
Japanese Albums (Oricon)	9
New Zealand Albums (RMNZ)	19
Norwegian Albums (VG-lista)	13
Polish Albums (ZPAV)	19
Portuguese Albums (AFP)	5
Scottish Albums (Official Charts)	22
South Korean Foreign Albums (RIAK)	12
Spanish Albums (PROMUSICAE)	12
Swedish Albums (Sverigetopplistan)	7
Swiss Albums (Schweizer Hitparade)	3
UK Albums (Official Charts)	13
UK R&B Albums (Official Charts)	1
US Billboard 200	2
US Top R&B/Hip-Hop Albums (Billboard)	5

=== Year-end charts ===
2002 year-end chart performance for This Is Me... Then
Chart (2002)	Position
Belgian Albums (Ultratop Flanders)	88
Belgian Albums (Ultratop Wallonia)	86
Canadian Albums (Nielsen SoundScan)	50
Canadian R&B Albums (Nielsen SoundScan)	9
Danish Albums (Hitlisten)	95
Dutch Albums (Album Top 100)	82
Finnish Foreign Albums Chart	36
French Albums (SNEP)	47
UK Albums (OCC)	59
Worldwide Albums (IFPI)	19

2003 year-end chart performance for This Is Me... Then
Chart (2003)	Position
Australian Albums (ARIA)	49
Australian Urban Albums (ARIA)	6
Austrian Albums (Ö3 Austria)	67
Belgian Albums (Ultratop Flanders)	92
Belgian Albums (Ultratop Wallonia)	88
Dutch Albums (Album Top 100)	46
French Albums (SNEP)	110
German Albums (Offizielle Top 100)	61
Hungarian Albums (MAHASZ)	78
New Zealand Albums (RMNZ)	45
UK Albums (OCC)	67
US Billboard 200	12
US Top R&B/Hip-Hop Albums (Billboard)	26

=== Decade-end charts ===
Decade-end chart performance for This Is Me... Then
Chart (2000–2009)	Position
US Billboard 200	189

== Certifications and sales ==
Certifications and sales for This Is Me... Then
Region	Certification	Certified units/sales
Australia (ARIA)	Platinum	70,000^{^}
Austria (IFPI Austria)	Gold	15,000^{*}
Belgium (BRMA)	Gold	25,000^{*}
Canada (Music Canada)	2× Platinum	200,000^{^}
Denmark (IFPI Danmark)	Gold	25,000^{^}
Finland (Musiikkituottajat)	Gold	19,998
France (SNEP)	2× Gold	220,000
Germany (BVMI)	Gold	200,000
Greece (IFPI Greece)	Platinum	30,000^{^}
Hungary (MAHASZ)	Gold	10,000^{^}
Japan (RIAJ)	Gold	100,000^{^}
Netherlands (NVPI)	Gold	40,000^{^}
New Zealand (RMNZ)	Gold	7,500^{^}
Portugal (AFP)	Gold	20,000^{^}
South Korea	—	11,527
Spain (Promusicae)	Platinum	100,000^{^}
Sweden (GLF)	Gold	30,000^{^}
Switzerland (IFPI Switzerland)	Platinum	40,000^{^}
United Kingdom (BPI)	2× Platinum	610,000
United States (RIAA)	2× Platinum	2,600,000
Summaries
Europe (IFPI)	Platinum	1,000,000^{*}
Worldwide	—	6,000,000
^{*} Sales figures based on certification alone.^{^} Shipments figures based on certification alone.

== Release history ==
Release history and formats for This Is Me... Then
Country	Date	Edition(s)	Label
France	November 25, 2002	Standard	Sony
Germany	November 25, 2002	Standard	Sony
United States	November 26, 2002	Standard	Epic
Japan	November 27, 2002	Standard	Sony
United Kingdom	March 22, 2004	Repackaged	Sony
