= Lemma =

Lemma (from Ancient Greek λῆμμα premise, assumption, from Greek λαμβάνω I take, I get) may refer to:

== Language and linguistics ==
- Lemma (morphology), the canonical, dictionary or citation form of a word
- Lemma (psycholinguistics), a mental abstraction of a word about to be uttered

== Science and mathematics ==
- Lemma (botany), a part of a grass plant
- Lemma (mathematics), a proven proposition used as a step in a larger proof

== Other uses ==
- Lemma (album), by John Zorn (2013)

== See also ==
- Analemma, a diagram showing the variation of the position of the Sun in the sky
- Dilemma
- Lema (disambiguation)
- Lemmatisation
- Neurolemma, part of a neuron
