= Jenny from the Block =

2002 single by Jennifer Lopez

Single by Jennifer Lopez featuring Jadakiss (Note: In rap version only.) and Styles P

from the album This Is Me... Then
- Released: September 26, 2002
- Studio: The Hit Factory (New York City); The Studio (Philadelphia, Pennsylvania); Lobo (Long Island, New York)
- Genre: R&B; Hip hop (rap/album version)
- Length: 3:08 (album version); 2:49 (no rap version)
- Label: Epic
- Songwriters: Jennifer Lopez; Troy Oliver; Andre Deyo; Samuel Barnes; Jean Claude Olivier; Jose Fernando Arbex Miro; Lawrence Parker; Scott Sterling; Michael Oliver; David Styles; Jason Phillips
- Producers: Troy Oliver; Cory Rooney; Poke and Tone; the Beatnuts (uncredited)

Jennifer Lopez singles chronology
"Alive" (2002)	"Jenny from the Block" (2002)	"All I Have" (2002)

Jadakiss singles chronology
"Day & Night" (2002)	"Jenny from the Block" (2002)	"Run" (2003)

Styles singles chronology
"The Life" (2002)	"Jenny from the Block" (2002)	"Locked Up" (2004)

Music videos
- "Jenny from the Block" on YouTube; "Jenny from the Block" (Rap version) on YouTube

"Jenny from the Block" is a song by American singer Jennifer Lopez, which features American rappers Jadakiss and Styles P, both members of the LOX. It was released by Epic Records on September 26, 2002, as the lead single from her third studio album, This Is Me... Then (2002). The song, first leaked online, was written by Lopez, Troy Oliver, Mr. Deyo, Samuel Barnes, and Jean Claude Olivier. Cory Rooney, Olivier, Barnes, and Oliver produced the song. Another version of the track features solely Lopez, which was part of the Brazilian edition of the album. The track is an R&B and old school hip hop song which makes use of multiple music samples, including from songs such as 20th Century Steel Band's "Heaven and Hell Is on Earth" (1975), Boogie Down Productions' "South Bronx" (1987), and "Hi-Jack" by Enoch Light. Lyrically, the track centers around Lopez paying homage to her roots in the Bronx and professing that fame has not changed her, while celebrating her success.

"Jenny from the Block" received polarized reviews from music critics. Some described it as "infectious" and praised its "catchiness" while others felt it was "silly" and found its message inauthentic. Lopez later opined that many had taken the song "too literally". Commercially, the song became a success, topping the charts in Canada, reaching number three on the US Billboard Hot 100 and charting within the top ten of several major music markets.

The song's controversial music video, directed by Francis Lawrence, depicts Lopez and her then-boyfriend Ben Affleck in various intimate scenes, captured from the point of view of the paparazzi and surveillance cameras. Viewed as a response to the moral panic generated by the couple's relationship, journalists noted that Lopez "flaunted" Affleck as a trophy male in the video, which was unconventional for a woman to do at the time. Affleck would later credit the video with nearly "ruining his career". Since its release, "Jenny from the Block" has been regarded as Lopez's most iconic single, and its lyrical content inspired a trend of similar songs by other artists. "Jenny from the Block" became a nickname for Lopez, who later sampled the song on "Hearts and Flowers", a track from her album This Is Me... Now (2024). Lopez has performed the song various times, including at the Super Bowl LIV halftime show in 2020 where it served as her opening number.

== Background and release ==
This Is Me... Then was scheduled to be released in November 2002. However, "Jenny from the Block" featuring rappers Jadakiss and Styles P of the LOX was leaked by a pop station in Hartford, Connecticut, and later distributed to other stations owned by Infinity Broadcasting. In response, Jennifer Lopez and Epic Records pushed forward the single's release date to September 26, the same day "Jenny from the Block" was officially sent to US radio. In comparison to her previous albums, On the 6 (1999) and J.Lo (2001), Lopez had a more "hands-on" role with This Is Me... Then. The album also had more of an adult-R&B sound. Musically, majority of the songs on This Is Me... Then were inspired by her relationship with then-fiancé, actor Ben Affleck. The Age newspaper said the album was a "declaration" of love for Affleck. During an interview, Lopez said "I wrote a lot of songs inspired, in a way, by what I was going through at the time that this album was being made, and he [Affleck] was definitely a big part of that." Several critics highlighted that the album showed how "smitten" she was, and that the content was borderline "annoying".

During the production of the album, Affleck and Lopez were a prominent super couple in the media, and were dubbed "Bennifer". Lopez stated "We try to make the best of it [sic] I'm not saying there's not times that we wish [we] could just be going to the movies and come out and there's not a crowd there waiting. You just want to spend your Sunday afternoon not working, but at the same time we both love what we do. If that's something that's part of it, then that's fine. We feel the love and we're very happy about it." The overexposure from the media and public interest in their relationship resulted in less admiration for their work and negatively affected their careers, in particular affecting the video for "Jenny from the Block".

== Production and lyrical content ==
"Jenny from the Block" (2002)
A 19-second sample consisting of the chorus from "Jenny from the Block", in which Lopez professes "No matter where I go, I know where I came from."

"Jenny from the Block" is an uptempo R&B and old school hip hop song. It was produced by Troy Oliver, written by Andre Deyo, remixed by Samuel Barnes, Jean-Claude Olivier, and contained samples by Enoch Light, Lawrence Parker, Scott Sterling and Michael Oliver. Trackmasters produced the song alongside Oliver and Cory Rooney. The song's lyrical content is about Lopez maintaining her integrity and remembering her roots, despite her recent wealth and fame. It differs from most of the material on This Is Me... Then, which was heavily inspired by her courtship with Affleck. In the song's chorus, Lopez expresses her desire to "remain simple despite her diamonds" as she sings: "Don't be fooled by the rocks that I got / I'm still, I'm still Jenny from the Block." The song served to rebut the notion that Lopez had "abandoned her roots" or alienated her core fanbase, the Hispanic and African American communities. "Jenny from the Block" was also a "celebration" of her success, with Lopez stating: "[Y]es, there’s a public image that I enjoy — I love dressing up. I love feeling glamorous. I love jewelry and beautiful things ... But I’m still that little girl who’s playing the part of a movie star, that same girl from the Bronx wearing big hoop earrings and listening to hip-hop.

"Jenny from the Block" samples a number of songs. The opening line of the track, "Children grow and women producing, men go working, some go stealing, everyone's got to make a living", is derived from 20th Century Steel Band's 1975 song "Heaven and Hell Is on Earth". The constant flute loop through the song is an interpolation of Enoch Light's "Hi-Jack" (1975), while the bridge samples Boogie Down Productions' "South Bronx" (1986). Trackmasters allegedly incorporated the sample of the Beatnuts' song "Watch Out Now" from their album A Musical Massacre (1999), which also sampled "Hi-Jack", on the track. Believing Lopez and the song's producers had copied their sample of "Hi-Jack" without consent, they subsequently insulted Lopez on the song "Confused Rappers", from their album Milk Me (2004). The group said: "Anybody familiar with our music who heard 'Jenny from the Block' knew it was a Beatnuts beat. There's no getting around it. That's a straight-up bite. It's the same drums, the same flute, the same tempo... everything is our idea. If we never flipped that sample, there would be no 'Jenny from the Block'."

== Critical response ==
"Jenny from the Block" generated a polarized reception among music critics and audiences, with some applauding it as a "strong self statement" and homage to Lopez's roots, and others dismissing it as "silly". Sal Cinquemani of Slant Magazine called the song "infectious", but noted that it is "more like a disease than a chunky casserole". Tom Sinclair of Entertainment Weekly was favorable, writing: "Lopez insists that fame hasn't changed her, and seduced by the breezy pleasure of her new music, we're almost inclined to believe her". Arion Berger of Rolling Stone opined that the song "is worth listening to — its windup/wind-down chorus is as sly and curvy as Lopez". Complex magazine praised the inclusion of the "South Bronx" sample, writing: "What better way to connect to her roots musically than to put on for her hometown with the greatest Bronx anthem ever put to wax ...?" Billboard praised the song's "sticky-on-first-listen catchiness".

AllMusic's Stephen Thomas Erlewine gave the song an unfavorable review, calling it "silly" and describing the lyrics as "laughable". James Poletti of Yahoo! Music was also negative, calling it "agonizing" and a "cynical appropriation of hip-hop culture". Critical of the song's themes, AOL Radio remarked: "Yup, just your average girl, willing to risk a national TV gig over the size of her 'dressing-room compound.'" Writing for The Village Voice, Jon Caramanica was highly unfavorable of "Jenny from the Block", stating that "Jenny aims to fast-talk herself into authenticity". Amy Sciarretto of PopCrush observed in 2012: "'Jenny From the Block' is quite a polarizing track ... Either you love the 'J. Lo' tune because it's boastful and oozes confidence or you hate it because it's cheesy and makes use of flutes." Years later, Lopez opined that many had taken the song "too literally":

People are dumb enough to have thought that you meant it literally, like you were still in the ’hood, or "She’s changed, she’s different, she’s so rich now, she’s not the same." It was a huge hit at the time, so I never thought of it in any negative way. I didn’t feel like people were saying that — it’s probably better that I didn’t know.

Listicles for "Jenny from the Block"
Publication	Year	Listicle	Result	Ref.
VH1 and Blender	2004	50 Most Awesomely Bad Songs ... Ever	33rd	
Channel 4	2004	The 100 Worst Pop Records	10th	
BBC	2007	The 100 Most Annoying Pop Songs...We Hate To Love	100th	
AOL Radio	2010	100 Worst Songs Ever	Placed	
Time	2014	17 of the Best Songs About NYC	12th	
Her Campus	2015	15 Songs We're Embarrassed to Still Know All the Lyrics To	Placed	
Billboard	2022	100 Greatest Songs of 2002	15th	

== Commercial performance ==
=== North America ===
On the US Billboard Hot 100, "Jenny from the Block" debuted at number 67 for the week of October 12, 2002. By its third week on the Hot 100, the song had propelled to the top twenty, reaching number 17. For the Billboard issue dated November 23, 2002, it entered the top ten of the Hot 100, jumping to number eight. It also reached the top ten of the Hot 100 Airplay chart, at number nine. The following week, the song continued climbing the Hot 100, moving to number six, while also reaching the top five of the Hot 100 Airplay chart. By December 14, it had peaked at three on the Hot 100, where it remained for three weeks, and also jumped to three on the Airplay chart. Three weeks later, on December 28, "Jenny from the Block" remained stalling at three on the Hot 100 and the Airplay chart. For three weeks it had been blocked from the top spot of both charts by Eminem's "Lose Yourself" and Missy Elliott's "Work It". It peaked at two on the US Mainstream Top 40 Pop Songs and 22 on the US Hot R&B/Hip-Hop Songs chart.

=== Internationally ===
In Australia, "Jenny from the Block" made its debut inside the top ten at number eight on December 1, 2002. On January 5, 2003, it moved to its peak of five, where it remained for two weeks, and spent a total of sixteen weeks on the chart. The song peaked atop the Billboard Canadian Hot 100, becoming her third number-one there following "If You Had My Love" (1999) and "Love Don't Cost a Thing" (2001). In Italy, it debuted at its peak of number four on December 21, and remained on the chart for sixteen weeks, all of which it remained in the top ten for; exiting on March 6, 2003. In New Zealand, it debuted at 49 on November 11, 2002; it peaked at number six on December 8 and spent a total of sixteen weeks on the chart. It was certified Gold by RIANZ for sales of 7,500 copies. It peaked at number two in Spain on December 24, 2002. In the United Kingdom, it peaked at number three on the UK Singles Chart, becoming her ninth top-ten hit in Britain, as well as her fourth song to peak at three. In May 2023, the song was certified platinum for sales and streams exceeding 600,000 units. In Norway, the song debuted at number six and peaked at five. It has been certified platinum there for sales of 10,000 copies. In France, the song debuted at number fifty-two and peaked at five, becoming her fifth top ten in the country at this time. It has been certified gold there for over 250,000 copies sold.

== Music video ==
=== Background and synopsis ===
The song's accompanying music video was directed by Francis Lawrence and prominently co-stars Lopez's then-boyfriend, Ben Affleck. Its themes revolve around voyeurism and the media invading Lopez's life. She is like a "lab rat being constantly observed" in the video, which sought to depict the lack of privacy that comes with fame. Lawrence came up with the video's concept and convinced Lopez to ask Affleck to appear in it. Lopez later admitted in 2024 that she would have chosen a different concept: "'Jenny from the Block' should have been me back in the Bronx kind of walking around the neighborhood." The video was filmed entirely in Los Angeles from October 18–20, 2002. It premiered on MTV's Total Request Live on November 5, 2002.

Lopez collaborated with stylist Andrea Lieberman on her outfits for the video. Lieberman said "...she was so into fashion that we had the opportunity to really change things up and push the envelope there." In a scene where Lopez performs the song amid New York City traffic, she sports a mesh tank top, a newsboy cap, cargo pants and heeled Timberland boots. In another scene, she wears only a white fur coat and silver bikini bottoms.

Lopez and Affleck surveilled by a camera in the "Jenny from the Block" music video

The video begins with surveillance camera footage of Lopez and Affleck in their apartment; the rest of the video features moments captured by the paparazzi, interspersed with clips showcasing the "reality". As the song begins, Lopez dances in her apartment to music on her Mp3 player. She also performs the song amid bright lights and traffic on the streets of New York City. Separate shots depict Lopez on a yacht: she sunbathes topless with friends (her breasts being blurred), and after swimming in the ocean with Affleck, he kisses her buttocks and unties her bikini. The couple have lunch at a restaurant and go to a gas station, where Lopez is behind the wheel while Affleck pumps gas. At several moments, the viewer is shown shots through the lens of the paparazzi and "official" media framing, before the reality is shown. Affleck kneels down to find Lopez's earring, which is turned into a freeze-frame shot that suggests Affleck is proposing. Lopez gets something in her eye, and the paparazzi shots make it appear as if she was in tears. Lopez later visits a jewelry store, sings "Loving You" in a recording studio, and spends time with Affleck by the pool.

=== Reception and aftermath ===
"Although it came from an album that was about the two of them, "Jenny From the Block" was always her song — about her life and her vision of herself. In hindsight, it was only fitting that Affleck was merely an accessory in the video. Think of all the male singers who had their girlfriends pose as eye-candy in their clips — this time, it was the guy’s turn."

— Tim Grierson of MEL magazine (2021)

Upon its release, the music video for "Jenny from the Block" sparked controversy and divided critics, though it has been considered iconic in retrospect. In 2003, Rob Walker of The New York Times wrote: "If J. Lo really thinks her public might punish her for losing touch with the block, then why rub our noses in her flagrantly bejeweled lifestyle on MTV?" Academic Jo Littler wrote that Lopez, as a Latin woman from the Bronx, offers "a celebration of materialist young feminism" in the song and music video: "It has long been recognised that cultures of ostentatious wealth are ways for disenfranchised people to stick two fingers up to those who held them down and back." Lopez's fashion in the video, particularly the outfit she sports while standing amid New York City traffic, is considered iconic and among the singer's signature looks. Cynthia Fuchs of PopMatters wrote that Lopez's response to negative media coverage "is admirably calculated. She meets it head-on." Publications like Elle and Business Insider have ranked "Jenny from the Block" as Lopez's best music video, with the latter saying that it "stands the test of time."

Affleck's appearance in the video became notorious, having been released at the peak of the couple's "frenzied" tabloid coverage. Kalhan Rosenblatt of NBC News stated that the scene where Affleck kisses Lopez's "rear end" had become "enshrined in pop culture history". Paper magazine wrote: "Love makes people do crazy things, and that's our only explanation for this." Journalists have regarded the video as a response to the "moral panic" the couple's relationship generated, including around issues of race and gender. In 2021, Affleck stated that people had written "sexist, racist, ugly vicious shit" about Lopez at the time, which "if you wrote it now, you would literally be fired". Writing for The Telegraph, Helen Brown described "a confident Latin woman with a trophy white male film star on her arm" as "political", "considering this was an era when only men were encouraged to flaunt their conquests." Vanity Fair critic Sonia Saraiya wrote that "Affleck is happy to be flaunted" in the video, "Lopez, meanwhile, came to girlboss culture a little early for everyone else; there was something threatening about her power." Saraiya observed Lopez to be "flaunting" Affleck "in the same way she's showing off her car, her furs, her chains."

Shortly after the video's premiere, Lopez and Affleck became engaged. Excessive media attention surrounding the couple, and Affleck's discomfort with the media scrutiny, factored into their eventual breakup. In 2008, Affleck said he nearly "ruined" his career by starring in the clip: "If I have a big regret, it was doing the music video. But that happened years ago. I've moved on." He also stated: "It not only makes me look like a petulant fool (to blame Lopez), but it surely qualifies as ungentlemanly? For the record, did she hurt my career? No." In response, Latina magazine wrote: "Riiiigght. So it wasn't a string of bad movies starting with Reindeer Games in 2000 and a general lack of on-screen appeal that ruined your career, right Ben? It was a music video. What else can we blame on a music video? Global warming?" Following Lopez's marriage to Marc Anthony, she reportedly attempted to have the music video blocked from television networks such as VH1 and MTV.

== Live performances ==
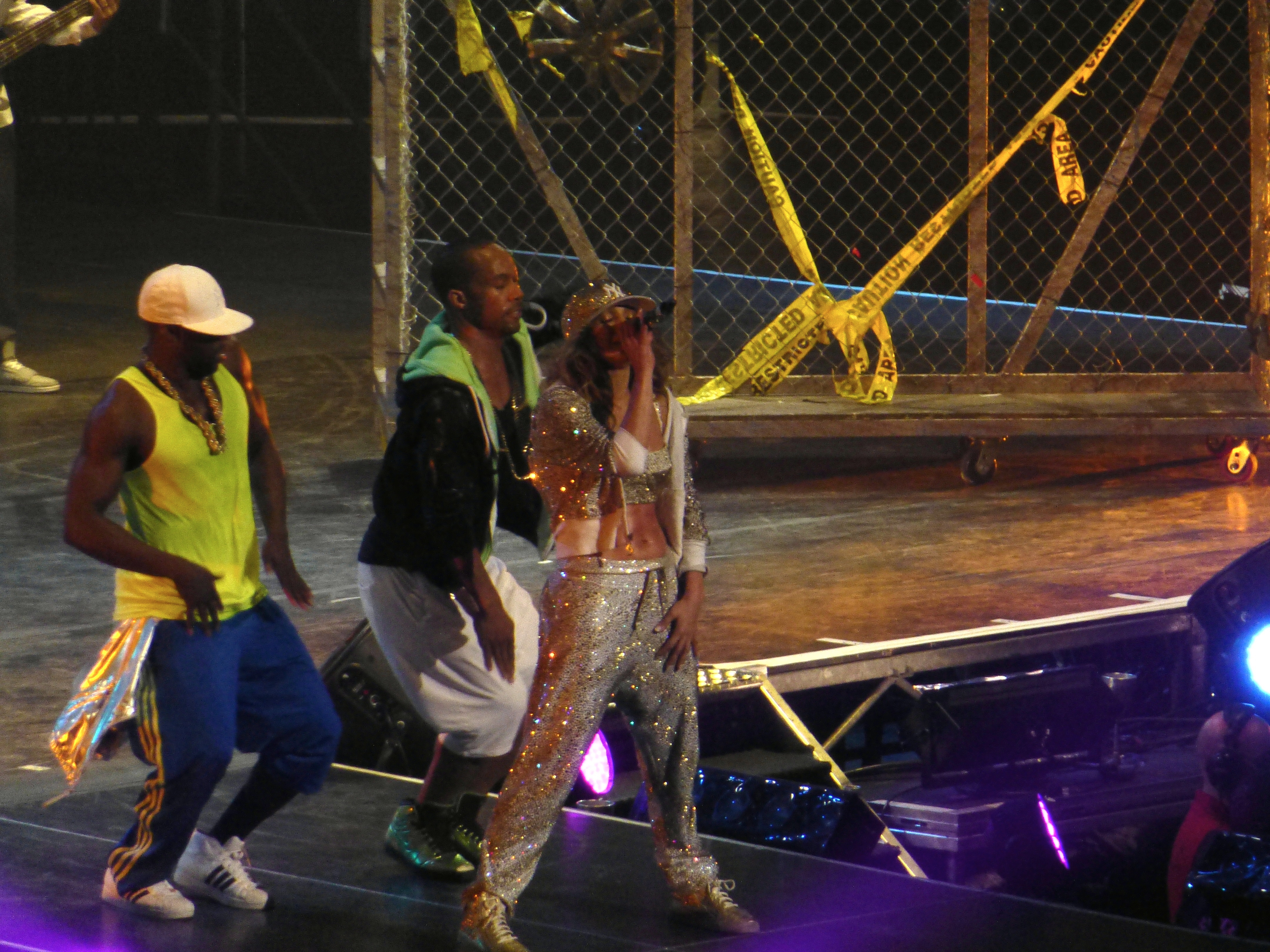
Lopez performing "Jenny from the Block" during the Dance Again World Tour in 2012, where the stage was "turned into an urban New York City scene."

Since its release, "Jenny from the Block" has been performed during all of Lopez's concert tours and residencies as of 2025. It was included on the setlist of the Dance Again World Tour in 2012, as part of the show's second act where she "returned to her Bronx roots". "Jenny from the Block" was the final song in a "Back-to-Bronx" medley choreographed by Parris Goebel that included "I'm Real", "Ain't It Funny (Murder Remix)" and "All I Have". It was performed during a similar hip hop-themed section of her Las Vegas residency, Jennifer Lopez: All I Have (2016–2018). At the It's My Party tour in 2019, which was a celebration of the singer's 50th birthday, the song was included during the hip hop portion of the show, during which she wore a "cheeky jumpsuit and shimmery New York fitted cap." At Up All Night: Live in 2025, Lopez performed a rock version of the song mashed up with "We Will Rock You" (1977) by Queen.

Lopez performed the song with Taylor Swift at the latter's Red Tour, with Swift bringing Lopez on stage as a surprise guest during her August 24, 2013, concert in Los Angeles. Lopez performed "Jenny from the Block" as the encore during her first concert in the Bronx, which took place in Orchard Beach on June 4, 2014. "Jenny from the Block" was included in Lopez's medley at the 2018 MTV Video Music Awards on August 20, 2018, where she was presented with the Michael Jackson Video Vanguard Award. Lopez wore a "sparkle-drenched" jumpsuit as she performed the song in front of a prop 6 train.

The song was performed by Lopez during the 2020 Super Bowl LIV halftime show, where it served as the opening of her set. She appeared on stage atop a small model of the Empire State Building, a nod to her roots in New York City, as she began singing "Jenny from the Block". According to Lopez, this was a reference to King Kong and symbolized women being "on top of the world". She was clothed in a biker-inspired black leather outfit paired with a pink satin ball gown skirt; she tore the skirt off during her performance of the song, revealing black leather chaps. Greg Evans of Deadline Hollywood said it "let the world know in no uncertain terms that she and co-headliner Shakira belonged exactly where they were, at the heart of this most American event." Spencer Kornhaber of The Atlantic wrote: "Clasping a pole, looking down from a tower of human bodies, she started by serving regality: that of Queen Cleopatra's steely gaze, but also that of King Kong, the New York City titan."

== Impact ==
"Jenny from the Block" is considered one of Lopez's signature songs and most iconic single. It began a trend of songs which juxtaposed "the performer's upbringing to their celebrity status". The lyrical content of country artist Faith Hill's 2005 song "Mississippi Girl" was considered to be influenced by the song; Rolling Stone described it as "country music's version" of the single, and Billboard called it "a countrified 'Jenny from the Block'". Other songs noted to have followed the theme of "Jenny from the Block" were Gwen Stefani's "Orange County Girl" and Fergie and Ludacris' "Glamorous". American singer Taylor Swift described "Jenny from the Block" as her favorite song as a child, one that she would sing into her hair brush in front of her mirror. In 2020, while accepting an award for her series Fleabag at the 25th Critics' Choice Awards, actress Phoebe Waller-Bridge thanked Lopez for "accidentally" inspiring the show: "I decided that the priest's favorite song was 'Jenny from the Block' and it opened the whole character up for me."

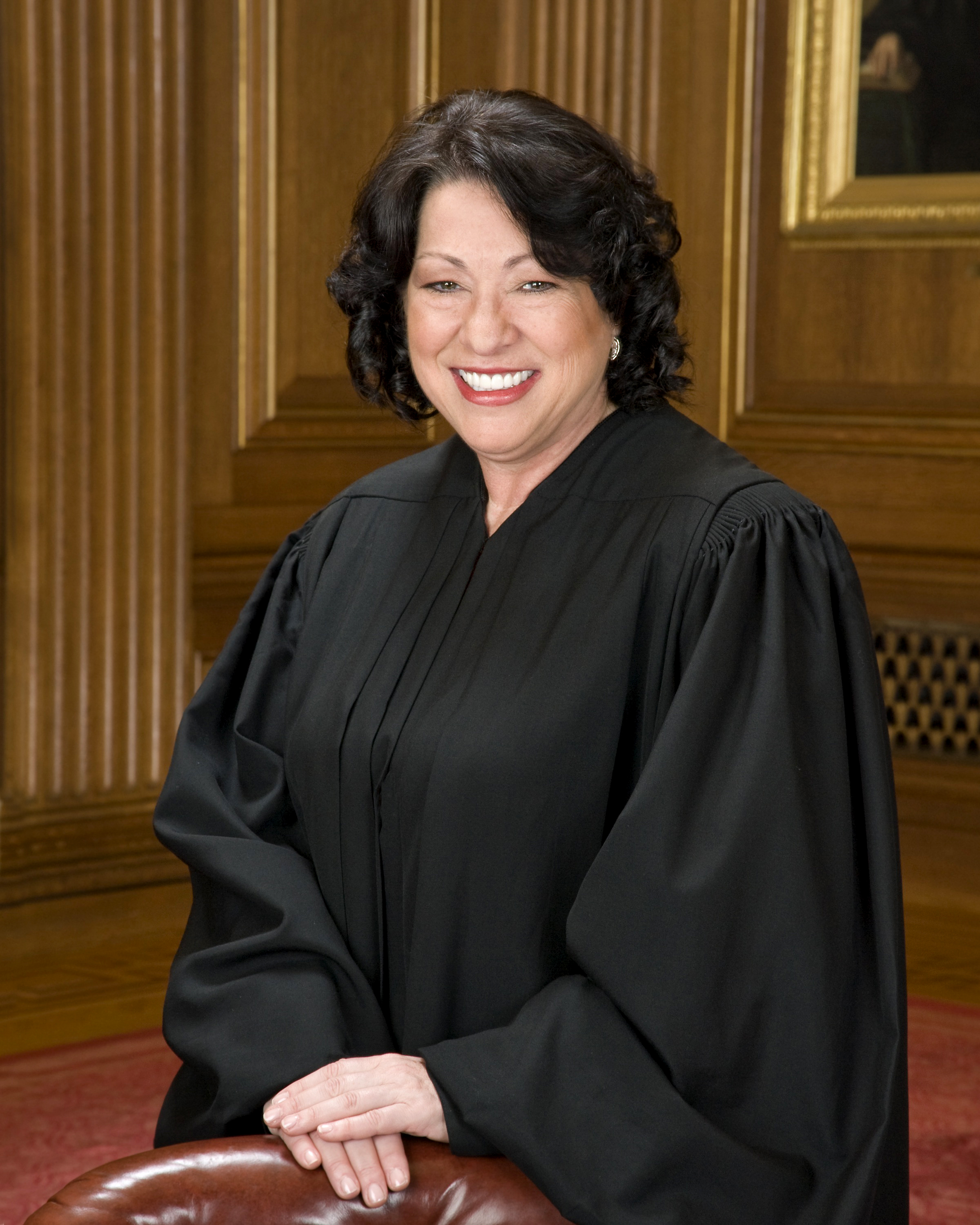
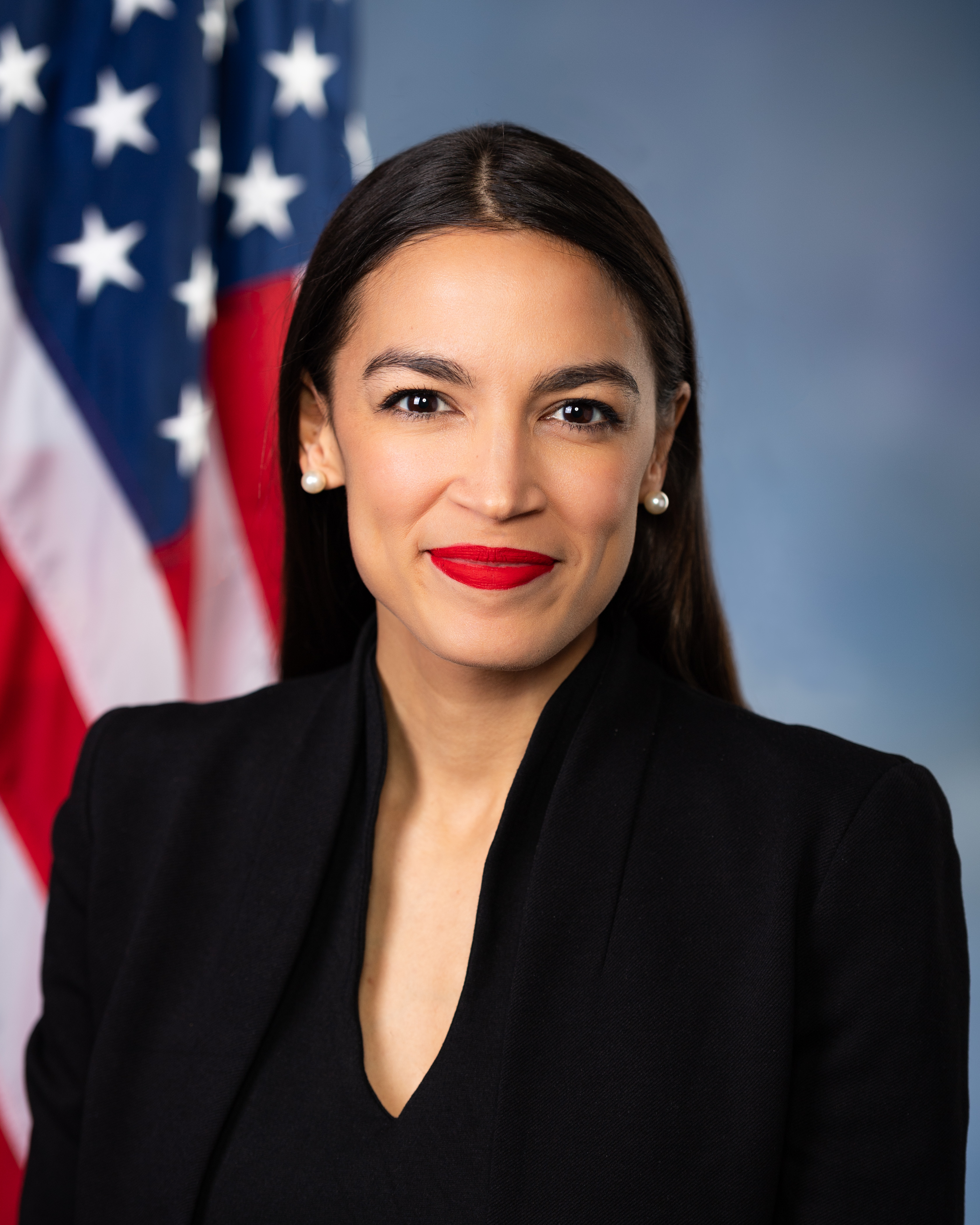
U.S. Supreme Court justice Sonia Sotomayor (left) has earned the nickname "Sonia from the Block", while representative Alexandria Ocasio-Cortez (right) used the song's lyrics in reference to herself.

Australian rapper Iggy Azalea referenced the song in her verse from Lopez's 2014 song "Booty", stating: "The last time the world seen a booty this good, it was on Jenny from the block." In Lopez's 2018 single, "Dinero" featuring DJ Khaled, American rapper Cardi B ends her verse by referencing rapper's and Lopez's beginnings: "Two bad bitches that came from the Bronx, Cardi from the pole and Jenny from the block". Rapper Drake, who Lopez was believed to have been romantically involved with in the past, references her and the song in his 2018 single "In My Feelings" from his album Scorpion, stating: "From the block like you Jenny/ I know you special, girl, 'cause I know too many."

Mexican American recording artist Becky G recorded a cover version of the song, entitled "Becky from the Block". The song's accompanying music video was shot in Inglewood, California. Lopez made a cameo appearance towards the end of the music video. The lyrics of this version are significantly different from the original. Entertainment Tonight described the version to have "give[n] Jenny's NY-based tune a West Coast slant". Lopez featured interpolations of "Jenny from the Block" on the song "Hearts and Flowers" from her ninth studio album, This Is Me... Now (2024), which was inspired by her reunion and 2022 marriage to Affleck. The song was referred to by some critics such as The Arts Desk as a "sequel of sorts" to "Jenny from the Block". South Korean singer Jennie was noted to have paid homage to "Jenny from the Block" on the song "With the IE (Way Up)" from her debut album Ruby (2025). The song also samples "Hi-Jack", while its title references the different spelling of "Jenny".

Since the song's release, Lopez has been nicknamed "Jenny from the Block" in the media, a name news reporters and journalists often use. At the 68th Golden Globe Awards in 2011, comedian Ricky Gervais referenced the song while introducing Lopez: "She's just Jenny from the block. If the block in question is that one on Rodeo Drive between Cartier and Prada." The song has also been referenced with respect to other public figures hailing from the Bronx. United States Supreme Court justice Sonia Sotomayor has been referred to as "Sonia from the Block" in the media, a nickname used by her own clerks. Representative Alexandria Ocasio-Cortez referenced the song's lyrics while showing off a plaque for her Capitol Hill office, writing: "Don't be fooled by the plaques that we got, I'm still, I'm still Alex from the Bronx" on Twitter.

The song has appeared in multiple viral videos. In October 2015, a video clip filmed in Afghanistan years ago surfaced online of two US Marines singing "Jenny from the Block" moments before being fired at by the Taliban. In 2020, actress Ana Coto went viral on TikTok with a video of her roller skating to "Jenny from the Block". Coto's video led to the revival of roller skating as a hobby.

== Track listings ==
US 12-inch single
No.	Title	Length
1.	"Jenny from the Block" (Track Masters remix)	3:08
2.	"Jenny from the Block" (Bronx instrumental)	3:07
3.	"Jenny from the Block" (Bronx remix (no rap) edit)	2:48
4.	"Jenny from the Block" (Bronx remix (no rap))	3:07
5.	"Jenny from the Block" (rap a cappella)	2:58

Canadian CD single
No.	Title	Length
1.	"Jenny from the Block" (Bronx remix (no rap) edit)	2:48
2.	"Jenny from the Block" (Track Masters remix)	3:08
3.	"Alive" (Thunderpuss radio mix)	4:12

UK CD1
No.	Title	Length
1.	"Jenny from the Block" (Bronx remix (no rap) edit)	2:48
2.	"Alive" (Thunderpuss radio mix)	4:12
3.	"Play" (Thunderpuss club mix)	8:18

UK CD2 and 12-inch single
No.	Title	Length
1.	"Jenny from the Block" (Trackmasters remix)	3:08
2.	"Jenny from the Block" (Bronx instrumental)	3:07
3.	"Love Don't Cost a Thing" (HQ2 club vocal mix)	10:54

European CD single
No.	Title	Length
1.	"Jenny from the Block" (Track Masters remix)	3:08
2.	"Jenny from the Block" (Bronx remix (no rap) edit)	2:48

European maxi-CD single
No.	Title	Length
1.	"Jenny from the Block" (Track Masters remix)	3:08
2.	"Jenny from the Block" (Bronx remix (no rap) edit)	2:48
3.	"Jenny from the Block" (Bronx instrumental)	3:07
4.	"Jenny from the Block" (rap a cappella)	2:58
5.	"Alive" (Thunderpuss radio mix)	4:12

Australian CD single
No.	Title	Length
1.	"Jenny from the Block" (Track Masters remix)
2.	"Jenny from the Block" (rap a cappella)
3.	"Jenny from the Block" (Bronx remix (no rap) edit)
4.	"Alive" (Thunderpuss club mix)

Japanese CD single
No.	Title	Length
1.	"Jenny from the Block" (Track Masters remix)
2.	"Jenny from the Block" (Bronx remix (no rap))

== Charts ==
=== Weekly charts ===
Weekly chart performance for "Jenny from the Block"
Chart (2002–2003)	Peak position
Australia (ARIA)	5
Australian Urban (ARIA)	3
Austria (Ö3 Austria Top 40)	7
Belgium (Ultratop 50 Flanders)	7
Belgium (Ultratop 50 Wallonia)	6
Canada (Nielsen SoundScan)	1
Canada Radio (Nielsen BDS)	3
Canada CHR/Top 40 (Nielsen BDS)	1
Denmark (Tracklisten)	3
Europe (Eurochart Hot 100)	4
Finland (Suomen virallinen lista)	18
France (SNEP)	5
Germany (GfK)	7
Guatemala (Notimex)	3
Hungary (Rádiós Top 40)	1
Hungary (Single Top 40)	4
Ireland (IRMA)	12
Italy (FIMI)	4
Netherlands (Dutch Top 40)	3
Netherlands (Single Top 100)	4
New Zealand (Recorded Music NZ)	6
Nicaragua (Notimex)	1
Norway (VG-lista)	5
Peru (Notimex)	2
Poland (Polish Airplay Charts)	2
Romania (Romanian Top 100)	4
Scottish Singles Sales (Official Charts)	8
Spain (Promusicae)	2
Sweden (Sverigetopplistan)	7
Switzerland (Schweizer Hitparade)	4
UK Singles (Official Charts)	3
UK Hip Hop/R&B (Official Charts)	2
US Billboard Hot 100	3
US Pop Airplay (Billboard)	2
US Hot R&B/Hip-Hop Songs (Billboard)	22
US Rhythmic Airplay (Billboard)	3

2023 weekly chart performance for "Jenny from the Block"
Chart (2023)	Peak position
Israel International Airplay (Media Forest)	12

2026 weekly chart performance for "Jenny from the Block"
Chart (2026)	Peak position
Romania Airplay (TopHit)	98

=== Monthly charts ===
Monthly chart performance for "Jenny from the Block"
Chart (2025)	Peak position
Romania Airplay (TopHit)	99

=== Year-end charts ===
2002 year-end chart performance for "Jenny from the Block"
Chart (2002)	Position
Australia (ARIA)	57
Canada (Nielsen SoundScan)	9
France (SNEP)	67
Italy (FIMI)	50
Netherlands (Dutch Top 40)	92
Netherlands (Single Top 100)	78
Sweden (Hitlistan)	100
Switzerland (Schweizer Hitparade)	72
UK Singles (OCC)	100
UK Airplay (Music Week)	70
UK Urban (Music Week)	32
US Mainstream Top 40 (Billboard)	78
US Rhythmic Top 40 (Billboard)	70

2003 year-end chart performance for "Jenny from the Block"
Chart (2003)	Position
Australia (ARIA)	32
Austria (Ö3 Austria Top 40)	60
Belgium (Ultratop 50 Wallonia)	61
Brazil (Crowley)	16
France (SNEP)	69
Germany (Media Control GfK)	61
Italy (FIMI)	34
Netherlands (Dutch Top 40)	88
Netherlands (Single Top 100)	90
Romania (Romanian Top 100)	20
Sweden (Hitlistan)	73
Switzerland (Schweizer Hitparade)	82
US Billboard Hot 100	55
US Mainstream Top 40 (Billboard)	26
US Rhythmic Top 40 (Billboard)	58

2024 year-end chart performance for "Jenny from the Block"
Chart (2024)	Position
Romania Airplay (TopHit)	182

2025 year-end chart performance for "Jenny from the Block"
Chart (2025)	Position
Romania Airplay (TopHit)	177

== Certifications ==
Certifications and sales for "Jenny from the Block"
Region	Certification	Certified units/sales
Australia (ARIA)	3× Platinum	210,000^{‡}
Belgium (BRMA)	Gold	25,000^{*}
Denmark (IFPI Danmark)	Gold	45,000^{‡}
France (SNEP)	Gold	250,000^{*}
Germany (BVMI)	Gold	250,000^{‡}
Italy (FIMI)	Gold	50,000^{‡}
New Zealand (RMNZ)	Gold	5,000^{*}
New Zealand (RMNZ) Digital	2× Platinum	60,000^{‡}
Norway (IFPI Norway)	Platinum	10,000^{*}
Switzerland (IFPI Switzerland)	Gold	20,000^{^}
United Kingdom (BPI)	Platinum	600,000^{‡}
United States (RIAA)	Platinum	1,000,000^{‡}
^{*} Sales figures based on certification alone.^{^} Shipments figures based on certification alone.^{‡} Sales+streaming figures based on certification alone.

== Release history ==
Release dates and formats for "Jenny from the Block"
Region	Date	Format(s)	Label(s)	Ref.
United States	September 26, 2002	Radio	Epic	
Germany	November 11, 2002	CD single	Epic	
Japan	November 13, 2002	CD single	Epic	
Australia	November 18, 2002	CD single	Epic	
United Kingdom	November 18, 2002	12-inch single; CD single	Epic	
Canada	November 26, 2002	CD single	Epic	
France	December 9, 2002	CD single	Epic	
