= Jennifer Lopez & Marc Anthony en Concierto =

2007 concert tour by Jennifer Lopez and Marc Anthony

- Continental tour by Jennifer Lopez and Marc Anthony
- Promotional poster for the tour
- Location: North America
- Associated album: Brave; Como Ama una Mujer; El Cantante
- Start date: September 28, 2007
- End date: November 7, 2007
- Legs: 1
- No. of shows: 19 in North America
- Attendance: 133,664 (Note: The attendance and box office gross is based on only 17 shows.)
- Box office: $26.8 million
Jennifer Lopez tour chronology
Let's Get Loud (2001)	Jennifer Lopez & Marc Anthony en Concierto (2007)	Dance Again World Tour (2012)
Marc Anthony tour chronology
Sigo Siendo Yo Tour (2006)	Jennifer Lopez & Marc Anthony en Concierto (2007)	Iconos Tour (2010)

Jennifer Lopez & Marc Anthony en Concierto (also known as the El Cantante Tour, Jennifer & Marc en Concierto, and simply En Concierto) was a co-headlining concert tour by American recording artists Jennifer Lopez and Marc Anthony. The tour began on September 28, 2007 and ended on November 7, 2007, reaching North America. At the end of 2007, the tour placed 59th on Pollstar's "Top 100 North American Tours", earning $13.8 million from 17 shows.

== Background ==
In January 2005, Lopez revealed to MTV News that was in the midst of planning a tour to support her fourth studio album, Rebirth. Lopez stated: "I've tried to plan a tour so many times [...] And we're planning it again. It is exciting. We'll see if it happens [...] I've learned not to get my hopes up. I can't wait!" Lopez also added that she envisioned the tour as "Just me doing my thing". However, details for a tour were never unveiled and there subsequently was never one.

As a performer, Marc Anthony was completed several tours with his "Juntos en Concierto" concert. Here, Anthony would be joined on stage by other latin pop singers (including Laura Pausini, Chayanne, Alejandro Fernández and Marco Antonio Solís), touring hispanophone regions within the United States and South America. The concert series became an annual event for Anthony, beginning in 2004.

Lopez stated that this would be her first concert tour ever, and commented on her plans for the tour saying:

"I'm going to do a couple of new songs, obviously from this album, and also from my Spanish album, and then of course my old, kinda standard hits. This is the first time, so a lot of my fans haven't gotten to see me at all perform these songs, so I'm going to try to pick all the best ones that they want to see. But you never know."

Anthony describes the tour as:

"It's just a monster show. As we creep up to it, just in a couple days, that's when I'm getting the magnitude of this, you know what I'm saying? I sit back and watch her set, and it's exciting. I'm so proud of her."

For the tour, one dollar from each ticket sold was donated to "Run for Something Better"—a charitable organization supporting physical fitness programs for children.

== Setlist ==
Marc Anthony
1. "Aguanile"
2. "Valió la Pena"
3. "Te Conozco Bien"
4. "Amar Sin Mentiras"
5. "Tu Amor Me Hace Bien"
6. "Nadie Como Ella"
7. "You Sang to Me"
8. "Y Hubo Alguien"
9. "Hasta Que Te Conocí"
10. "Faithfully"
11. "My Baby You"
12. "Ahora Quien"
13. "Volando Entre Tus Brazos"
14. "Preciosa"
15. "I Need to Know"
16. "Mi Gente"
Jennifer Lopez
1. "Brave" (Video Introduction)
2. "Do It Well"
3. "Jenny from the Block"
4. "If You Had My Love" (With elements from the Pablo Flores Remix)
5. "Me Haces Falta"
6. "Te Voy a Querer"
7. Medley:
  1. "Ain't It Funny (Murder Remix)"
  2. "I'm Real (Murder Remix)"
  3. "Hold You Down" (Cory Rooney Spring Mix)
  4. "All I Have"
8. "I'm Gonna Be Alright (Track Masters Remix)"
9. "Hold It, Don't Drop It"
10. "Qué Hiciste"
11. "Por Qué Te Marchas"
12. "Waiting for Tonight"
13. "Love Don't Cost a Thing"
14. "Get Right"
15. "Let's Get Loud"

Encore (performed with Anthony)

19. "Por Arriesgarnos"
20. "No Me Ames (Tropical Remix)"

Notes

- During her performance of "All I Have" at Madison Square Garden in New York City, Lopez was joined onstage by LL Cool J. At the same concert, Lopez was joined onstage by Fat Joe during the performance of "Hold You Down"
- "Me Haces Falta" was not performed at the Honda Center in Anaheim, California

== Shows ==
List of concerts, showing date, city, country, venue, tickets sold, number of available tickets and amount of gross revenue
Date	City	Country	Venue	Attendance	Revenue
North America
September 28, 2007	Atlantic City	United States	Trump Taj Mahal	—N/a	—N/a
September 29, 2007	Atlantic City	United States	Trump Taj Mahal	—N/a	—N/a
October 3, 2007	Uncasville	United States	Mohegan Sun Arena	—N/a	—N/a
October 5, 2007	Washington, D.C.	United States	Verizon Center	9,006 / 15,504	$858,184
October 7, 2007	New York City	United States	Madison Square Garden	—N/a	—N/a
October 8, 2007	New York City	United States	Madison Square Garden	—N/a	—N/a
October 10, 2007	Toronto	Canada	Air Canada Centre	—N/a	—N/a
October 12, 2007	Montreal	Canada	Bell Centre	11,422 / 11,422	$1,186,301
October 14, 2007	Chicago	United States	United Center	—N/a	—N/a
October 17, 2007	San Jose	United States	HP Pavilion	—N/a	—N/a
October 19, 2007	Los Angeles	United States	Staples Center	—N/a	—N/a
October 20, 2007	Anaheim	United States	Honda Center	—N/a	—N/a
October 26, 2007	Las Vegas	United States	MGM Grand Garden Arena	—N/a	—N/a
October 30, 2007	Dallas	United States	American Airlines Center	—N/a	—N/a
October 31, 2007	Houston	United States	Toyota Center	—N/a	—N/a
November 2, 2007	Miami	United States	American Airlines Arena	—N/a	—N/a
November 3, 2007	Miami	United States	American Airlines Arena	—N/a	—N/a
November 4, 2007	Orlando	United States	Amway Arena	—N/a	—N/a
November 7, 2007	Miami	United States	American Airlines Arena	—N/a	—N/a

== Cancelled shows ==
List of cancelled concerts, showing date, city, country, venue and cancellation reason
Date	City	Country	Venue	Reason
November 10, 2007 (Note: The show on November 10, 2007 at Cox Arena in San Diego was originally scheduled to take place on October 24, 2007, but was postponed due to wildfires.)	San Diego	United States	Cox Arena	Local San Diego County wildfires

== Critical reception ==
- Kelefa Sanneh (The New York Times) gave the tour a mixed review. Although he praised Anthony's performance, he had doubts about Lopez stating, "But no one expects Ms. Lopez to morph into a lung-busting powerhouse, and in some ways her shaky voice may add to her appeal: on the stage of an arena (and perhaps nowhere else), the A-list star is once more an underdog, getting by with a little help from her band and her husband and a few thousand friends".
- Justin Smith (Pegasus News) described the Anthony's performance as a throwback to the 1970s Tropicana Club. He further stated: "[Anthony] has a voice so powerful and seductive, it is no surprise that every woman in the audience melted the second the opening note was sung. The band pumped out the salsa clave just like it would have been at the Tropicana in New York in the 1970s, and I desperately wanted to get up and dance."
- Jane Stevenson (Jam! Showbiz) praised Anthony's performance but thought less of Lopez's skills remarking: "For Lopez, it is more about coming up with some kick-ass dance moves to distract and divert from her weak voice. JLo can usually shake her ample behind with the best of them given her Fly Girl history on In Living Color but with an apparent bun in the oven, Lopez's movements were kept to a minimum -- she performed them in short spurts with the exception of Get Right -- and let her dancers take over most of the A-moves."
