= Mile in These Shoes =

Song by Jennifer Lopez

from the album Brave
- Recorded: 2007
- Studio: The Poolhouse (New York, NY); Record Plant (Los Angeles, CA)
- Genre: EDM; rock
- Length: 3:16
- Label: Epic
- Songwriter(s): Chasity Nwagbara; Onique Williams
- Producer(s): Warren "Oak" Felder

"Mile in These Shoes" is a song recorded by American singer Jennifer Lopez for her sixth studio album Brave (2007).

== Background and media usage ==
Following the release of her first Spanish-language album Como Ama una Mujer (2007), Lopez began working on her sixth studio album, which she confirmed would return her to the pop, R&B and hip-hop music of her previous English studio album Rebirth (2005); promising fans "dance-able music". The album was later announced to be Brave. Of the concept behind the album, Lopez stated: "When I was making the music and listening to it, I realized I am looking at my own experiences, and to me that is a very brave thing to do, to put that out there. This is what I've been about, not just in love and relationships, but also in life. Not being afraid, just going for it". "Mile in These Shoes", one of the songs on the album, was used for promotion for the popular American ABC television series Desperate Housewives.

== Composition ==
"Mile in These Shoes" is sung by Lopez through a nasal vocal tone. The song's lyricism refers to Lopez's her hardships as a celebrity; she sings lines such as "Honey, these pumps are too big to fill" and "My strut's so fierce" over a syncopated electronic melody. It has been noted by The New York Post to be an autobiographical song. PopMatters noted the track to autobiographical to be "rock-etched".

== Chart performance ==
Despite never being issued as an official single, "Mile in These Shoes" experienced strong digital downloads in Finland, resulting in a debut on the Finnish Singles Chart at number 20 for the week beginning April 13, 2008. The following week, the song peaked at number 16, before falling out of the chart the next week. In addition, "Mile in These Shoes" spent over four weeks on the Official Finnish Download List, where it peaked at number 14. In fact, the song performed better in Finland than Brave's lead single, "Do It Well".

== Critical response ==
Joey Guerra of The Houston Chronicle praised the song and stated that Lopez "keeps the eye-rolling at bay with her slinky delivery of the tongue-in-cheeky lyrics", noting the track to be a "requisite poor-me, diva declaration". Dan Aquilante of the New York Post also positively reviewed the song, stating that it is one of the "winner" tracks on Brave, with lyrics that project Lopez's "tough broad" attitude. Mike Joseph of the website PopMatters, however, on the other hand gave the song negative feedback, labeling it "embarrassing".

== Charts ==
Chart performance for "Mile in These Shoes"
Chart (2008)	Peak position
Finland (Suomen virallinen lista)	16
Finland Download (Suomen virallinen lista)	14
