= Brave (Jennifer Lopez album) =

Studio album by Jennifer Lopez
- Released: October 4, 2007
- Recorded: 2006–2007
- Studios: The Poolhouse (New York, NY); The Vault (New York, NY); Zac's Recording Studio (Atlanta, GA); Record Plant (Los Angeles, CA); LaBronze Johnson Studios (New York, NY); Sony Music Studios (New York, NY); Audio Archaeology; Mansfield Studios (Los Angeles, CA)
- Genres: Pop; funk; R&B
- Length: 47:53
- Label: Epic
- Producers: Michelle Lynn Bell; Bloodshy & Avant; Bigg D; Chuck Brody; The Clutch; Dirty Swift; Oak Felder; Hit-Boy; Peter Wade Keusch; The Platinum Brothers; Julio Reyes Copello; Johnny Rodeo; Jonathan "J.R." Rotem; Ryan "Alias" Tedder; Bruce Wayyne

Jennifer Lopez chronology
Como Ama una Mujer (2007)	Brave (2007)	Love? (2011)

Singles from Brave
- 1. "Do It Well" Released: August 21, 2007; 2. "Hold It Don't Drop It" Released: October 26, 2007

Brave is the sixth studio album by American singer and actress Jennifer Lopez. It was released on October 4, 2007, by Epic Records. Drawing inspiration from her marriage to Marc Anthony, the album incorporates influences from artists such as Jamiroquai and Sade, blending pop, funk and R&B with prominent samples from 1970s music. The project marked a shift in collaboration, as Lopez worked with a new group of producers and songwriters, including Ryan Tedder, Midi Mafia, J.R. Rotem, Bloodshy, Lynn & Wade LLP, and The Clutch, while continuing her long-standing partnership with Cory Rooney throughout the album.

The album earned a mixed reception from critics, with some complimenting its production, calling the album one of her strongest albums to date, while many called it a formulaic and bland album. Brave was considered a commercial disappointment, debuting at number twelve on the US Billboard 200 and becoming Lopez's lowest-selling and lowest-charting album to date. While it achieved moderate success in markets such as Japan, Switzerland, and Italy, the album underperformed in the United Kingdom and Australia, selling around 650,000 copies worldwide by 2013.

The album spawned two worldwide singles: "Do It Well" and "Hold It Don't Drop It". The first received generally favorable reviews, and reached the top-twenty in multiple countries, while peaking at number 31 on the Billboard Hot 100 chart. The latter also received positive reaction, but did not make any significant impact on the charts. Therefore, subsequent singles were cancelled due to the low-impact of previous singles on the charts. Lopez promoted the album with a series of live performances, while also embarking on a co-headlining tour with Marc Anthony.

== Background and development ==
After releasing her fourth studio album, Rebirth (2005), which received mixed reviews from critics, spawned the worldwide hit "Get Right" and became a moderate success on the charts, Jennifer Lopez announced in 2006 that she was going to record her first Spanish album. According to the album's producer Estéfano, the album "will prove critics wrong" from its "big songs that require a voice". Como Ama una Mujer was released in March 2007, opening to a mixed reception, but with moderately high sales and a hit single, "Qué Hiciste".

In a MTV News interview while on the music video set for "Me Haces Falta", the album's second single, Lopez announced she was working on the follow-up to "Como Ama una Mujer" and her first English-language album since Rebirth. According to Jayson Rodriguez of MTV News, the album would see Lopez returning into the pop, R&B, and hip hop world. Lopez stated, "My Spanish album was kind of an opportunity to get away from what I do on my English [albums], to kind of express a different side of myself. This [next] album is more of what people and my fans are used to — you know, just kind of a dance, funk, R&B, hip-hop, all that stuff, all mixed up together to make some great pop music. Basically it's just danceable music," she said.

== Production and music ==
While on early stages, it was announced that Lopez was working once again with music producer Cory Rooney, who worked on most of her albums, and also Swizz Beatz. "I think I got her at a good time, she’s focused," Swizz said. "She got Marc [Anthony] by her side, he’s serious with the singing as well. And the energy is good, so I’m here to help make history." In July 2007, Yahoo! announced Timbaland, Jermaine Dupri, newcomers Lynn & Wade LLP (Michelle Bell and Peter Wade) and J.R. Rotem as the other producers. A month later, Billboard added Ryan Tedder, Midi Mafia and Bloodshy as further collaborators. She described Brave as "a little Jamiroquai, a little Sade. It's real feel-good music and not what everyone's expecting."

Brave is a pop, funk, and R&B album. The opening track "Stay Together", co-written and produced by J.R. Rotem, is an anthem of monogamy where she declares that heartbreak and dating are so passé, that toughing it out is the new trend. "Heartbreaks are overrated, stay together, that's the new trend," insists Lopez on the dance song filled with breakbeats and synth fills. Second track "Forever" was described as "harem R&B", having a "gut-bucket dirge rhythms", in a song about making sure she is with her significant other for the rest of her life. "Hold It Don't Drop It" references the chugging bass line from "It Only Takes a Minute", the 1975 disco-funk song by Tavares. Fourth track and lead-single "Do It Well" was considered a "classic dance floor J-Lo with its hip-hop beat and disco sirens at the bridge." It samples the breakdown from Eddie Kendricks' 1973 smash "Keep on Truckin'." Ryan Tedder co-wrote and produced the song, stating: "I love that song. It's a lot of fun. I'd never done a song like it at that point. I took it as a challenge. I just looked at some of the top pop female artists at the time: JLo, Beyoncé, Rihanna, Britney before she went off the reservation. I thought, `I know I can write just as well as (their songwriters).' She heard it, flipped out, and it became the first single."

"Gotta Be There" samples the intro of Michael Jackson's 1971 Motown hit "I Wanna Be Where You Are" and references hip-hop dancefloor burner "Puerto Rico", while "Never Gonna Give Up" begins with almost two minutes of her voice weaving in and out of a string orchestra, with lyrics discussing about finding closure after a difficult breakup, which was alleged to be about her ex-fiancée Ben Affleck, especially the lyrics, "Forgiving him was the first thing I had to do in order to move on/Forgetting him was not as easy to do." The rock-etched "Mile in These Shoes" features spare verses, which seem to emerge from a "dank, empty warehouse", according to Slant Magazine's Eric Henderson, before the chorus opens up with a hip-hop/rock barrage of drums. Lyrically, the song thrusts a middle finger at the haters, with J.LO singing about they can't truly understand what it's like to be her until they walk a mile in her shoes. The midtempo synth-overloaded "The Way It Is" follows, with lively drums and string flourishes building toward a wall of synths, while midtempo "Be Mine" has "make-it-up-as-you-go-along" lyrics, including "Looking through a coffee table book at a small café on Broadway." In "I Need Love," Lopez convinces herself it's time to quit partying and settle down over zippy strings and percussion lifted from Bill Withers' "Use Me." The piano-spiked ballad "Wrong When You’re Gone" has softly clapping production, while the title track "Brave" finds Lopez singing about a newfound fearlessness, set to a steady beat and triumphant strings. The album closes with a remix of "Do It Well" featuring Ludacris.

== Promotion ==
The album's cover art was unveiled on September 5, 2007, along with its track list. The art taken by Alexei Hay sports two 'Jennifers' facing each other in front of purple futuristic background. Spence D. of IGN picked the song as the "Album Cover of the Week", due to the "wonderful" disco allusions contained in the cover art. Weeks later, promotional photos from "Brave" were released. The album's marketing campaign started with a 9-day trip to London. The singer who visited the British capital with husband Marc Anthony performed "Do It Well" in U.K. TV show called 'Parkinson'. Lopez also performed on "Good Morning America" (singing "Do It Well", "Hold It Don't Drop It" and "Let's Get Loud"), "Dancing With the Stars", "Fashion Rocks" (performing "Do It Well" and "Waiting for Tonight") and others. Lopez also embarked on a tour with Marc, the "Jennifer Lopez and Marc Anthony en Concierto", on September 29 in New Jersey and concluded it on November 3 in Miami.

=== Singles ===
"Do It Well" was released as the lead single of Brave. The song was sent to radio stations on August 21, 2007, and digitally on September 17, 2007. It was a minor hit in the U.S., charting at number 31 on the Billboard Hot 100, but topped the US Hot Dance Club Songs chart. Elsewhere, the song fared better, reaching number two in Italy, while peaking inside the top-twenty in six countries. The accompanying music video "has her delivering J-Lo blows to S&M kidnappers in a sleazy basement club." "Hold It, Don't Drop It" was released as the second and final single from the album on January 21, 2008. It only charted on the UK Singles Chart for three weeks, reaching a peak of 72. The video directed by Melina Matsoukas, which featured a pregnant Lopez, premiered December 4, 2007.

=== Other charted songs ===
Due to digital sales, "Mile in These Shoes" charted in Finland at number sixteen on the singles chart and number fourteen on the download chart. The album's title track "Brave" reached the 4th position in the Russian airplay chart.

== Critical reception ==
Professional ratings
Aggregate scores
Source	Rating
Metacritic	52/100
Review scores
Source	Rating
AllMusic	3/5 stars
Entertainment Weekly	C
The Guardian	3/5 stars
New York Post	3.5/4 stars
NOW	2/4 stars
PopMatters	3/10
Rolling Stone	2.5/5 stars
Slant Magazine	3/5 stars
Yahoo! Music	7/10

Brave received mostly mixed reviews from most music critics, according to Metacritic, which assigns a normalized rating out of 100 to reviews from mainstream critics, receiving an average score of 52, based on twelve reviews. Kerri Mason of Billboard was positive with the album, calling it "another market-smart collection of radio fodder, rather than Lopez's artistic breakout," remarking that "no one does classy pop quite like she does." Dan Gennoe of Yahoo! Music complimented the album, calling it "actually one of her strongest albums to date - tied with 2005's uncharacteristically complete and substantial Rebirth." While considering an "excellent record", Dan Aquilante of New York Post opined that it was "Lopez's best effort since her 2002 groundbreaking remix disc J to tha L-O!." Alex Macpherson of The Guardian praised the album for its "chunky bass lines, disco strings and purring beats", noting that "while marriage may have made Lopez happier than ever-the production bounces with positivity-it has not diminished her capacity for being a diva in the slightest."

Stephen Thomas Erlewine of AllMusic called it "comfortable", writing that "it doesn't try too hard, it doesn't have many surprises, but it's cheerful and not without its charms [...] It's nothing more than modest music for mellow good times, but it's lively enough to be fleeting fun, with enough good tunes for a mild party, preferably one that's held at home." Jason Richards of NOW agreed, writing that the songs are "formulaic but catchy, and the production is meticulous." Eric Henderson of Slant Magazine praised the song "The Way It Is", calling it "a nice head of steam all the way up to its double-time wall of sound", but criticized the fact that the album "aims to uphold the standards of individuality we have, for whatever reason, come to expect from our dance floor divas." Daniel Wolfe of About.com commented that "the beats are so light and the lyrics so bland that only a few tracks give us a glimpse of what once was an exciting dance floor diva." In a more negative tone, Mike Joseph of PopMatters wrote that the album "has neither a strong artistic personality nor boffo production, and as a result, ends up being just another disposable pop record with no redeeming value." Jonathan Bernstein of Entertainment Weekly commented that "even expensive beats and uplifting material are offset by listless vocals." Eventually, Entertainment Weekly placed the album at number 5 on their list of worst albums of 2007.

== Commercial performance ==
Brave was generally viewed as a commercial disappointment. It debuted at number twelve on the US Billboard 200 with 52,600 copies sold in its first week, making it her first studio effort to miss the chart's top ten. In its second week, the album suffered a big fall to number 38 (dropping 65%). It has sold 173,000 copies in the United States to date, making it Lopez's lowest-selling and lowest-charting album of her career until This Is Me... Now in 2024. In Japan, the album peaked at number six on the Japanese Albums Chart, while reaching the same placement on the Swiss Albums Chart. In Italy, "Brave" charted within the top-ten, while in the UK, it missed the top-twenty, debuting at number 24, remaining on the charts for only two weeks. In Australia, "Brave" only spent one week on the charts, debuting and peaking at number 46. Brave has sold 650,000 copies worldwide as of 2013. Critic Anna Barbarella suggested that the album "performed catastrophically on the charts because [Lopez] embraces a hardness which alienated the public."

== Track listing ==
Brave – Standard edition
No.	Title	Writer(s)	Producer(s)	Length
1.	"Stay Together"	J. R. Rotem; Chasity Nwagbara; E. Kidd Bogart	Rotem; Cory Rooney^{[a]}	3:30
2.	"Forever"	Balewa Muhammad; Candice Nelson; Ezekiel "Zeke" Lewis; Patrick "J.Que" Smith; Chauncey Hollis	Hit-Boy; The Clutch^{[b]}; Rooney^{[a]}	3:39
3.	"Hold It Don't Drop It"	Kevin Risto; Waynne Nugent; Jennifer Lopez; Allen Phillip Lees; Frankie Storm; Janet Sewell; Cynthia Lissette; Dennis Lambert; Brian Potter	Dirty Swift; Bruce Wayyne; Rooney^{[a]}; Philosophy^{[c]}	3:55
4.	"Do It Well"	Ryan "Alias" Tedder; Leonard Caston; Anita Poree; Frank Wilson	Tedder; Rooney^{[a]}	3:05
5.	"Gotta Be There"	Adam Gibbs; Michael Chesser; Crystal Johnson; Travis "Supercat" Cherry; Leon Ware; Arthur Ross	The Platinum Brothers; Cherry^{[b]}; Rooney^{[a]}	3:57
6.	"Never Gonna Give Up"	Michelle Lynn Bell; Peter Wade Keusch; Lopez	Keusch; Bell; Julio Reyes Copello; Rooney^{[a]}	4:21
7.	"Mile in These Shoes"	Nwagbara; Onique Williams	Oak Felder; Rooney^{[a]}	3:16
8.	"The Way It Is"	Bell; Keusch; Lopez; Rhonda Robinson; Gennaro Leone; Bruce Rudd	Keusch; Bell; Rooney^{[a]}	3:07
9.	"Be Mine"	Bell; Keusch; Robinson; John Hill; Caleb Shreve; Lopez; Bobby Hebb	Keusch; Bell; Johnny Rodeo; Chuck Brody; Rooney^{[a]}	3:20
10.	"I Need Love"	Bell; Keusch; Robinson; Hill; Schreve; Lopez	Bell; Keusch; Johnny Rodeo; Brody; Rooney^{[a]}	3:52
11.	"Wrong When You're Gone"	Lewis; Smith; Muhammad; Nelson; Keri Hilson	Bigg D; The Clutch; Rooney^{[a]}	3:58
12.	"Brave"	Christian Karlsson; Pontus Winnberg; Lewis; Muhammad; Smith; Nelson	Bloodshy & Avant; The Clutch; Rooney^{[a]}	4:21
13.	"Do It Well" (featuring Ludacris) (bonus track)	Tedder; Christopher Bridges; Caston; Poree; Wilson	Tedder; Rooney^{[a]}	3:33
Total length:				47:53

Brave — Digital edition (bonus track)
No.	Title	Writer(s)	Producer(s)	Length
14.	"Do It Well" (Moto Blanco radio mix)	Tedder; Caston; Poree; Wilson	Tedder; Rooney^{[a]}	3:01
Total length:				50:52

Brave — US iTunes Store and international digital edition (bonus track)
No.	Title	Writer(s)	Producer(s)	Length
15.	"Frozen Moments"	Bell; Keusch	Keusch; Bell; Rooney^{[a]}	3:43
Total length:				54:28

Brave — Deluxe edition (DVD)
No.	Title	Length
1.	"Get Right" (featuring Fabolous)	3:49
2.	"Hold You Down" (featuring Fat Joe)	4:31
3.	"Qué Hiciste"	4:18
4.	"Me Haces Falta"	3:35

Notes

- ^{^a} signifies a vocal producer
- ^{^b} signifies a co-producer
- ^{^c} signifies an additional producer
- "Hold It Don't Drop It" – Contains a sample of Tavares' "It Only Takes a Minute" (Dennis Lambert, Brian Potter)
- "Do It Well" – Contains a sample of Eddie Kendricks' "Keep on Truckin'" (Leonard Caston, Jr., Anita Poree, Frank Wilson)
- "Gotta Be There" – Contains a sample of Michael Jackson's "I Wanna Be Where You Are" (Leon Ware, Arthur Ross)
- "The Way It Is" – Contains a sample of Great Pride's "She's a Lady" (Gennaro Leone, Bruce Rudd)
- "Be Mine" – Contains a sample of Paul Mauriat's "Sunny" (Bobby Hebb)
- "I Need Love" – Contains a sample of Bill Withers' "Use Me" (Bill Withers)

== Personnel ==
- Pedro Alfonso – violin, viola
- Jim Annunziato – engineer
- Scott Barns – make-up
- Michelle Lynn Bell – producer, vocal arrangement, vocals (background)
- Big D – producer
- Chuck Brody – producer
- CFOS – mixing assistant
- Travis Cherry – producer
- Clutch – producer
- Alec Deruggiero – engineer
- Oak Felder – producer
- William Garrett – keyboards, engineer
- Larry Gold – conductor, string arrangements
- Alexei Hay – photography
- John Hill – producer, mixing
- Keri Hilson – vocals (background)
- Hit Boy – programming, producer, instrumentation
- Peter Wade Keusch – synthesizer, programming, producer, engineer, vocal arrangement, writing
- Gelly Kusuma – assistant engineer, mixing assistant
- Jennifer Lopez – executive producer
- Manny Marroquin – mixing
- Josh McDonnell – guitar, engineer
- Candice Nelson – vocals (background)
- Chasity Nwagbara – vocals (background)
- Ken Paves – hair stylist
- Philosophy – producer
- Herb Powers – mastering
- Julio C. Reyes – engineer, string arrangements, vocal producer
- Jared Robbins – mixing assistant
- Corey Rooney – executive producer, brass arrangement, vocal producer
- José Juan Sánchez – engineer
- Sizzler Ponderosa – vocals (background)
- Chris Soper – mixing assistant
- Corey Stocker – engineer
- Bruce Swedien – mixing
- Ryan Tedder – programming, producer, instrumentation
- Mike Tschupp – assistant engineer, mixing assistant
- Peter Wade – synthesizer, guitar, programming, mixing, writing
- Chasity Wagbara – vocals (background)
- Bruce Waynne – producer, engineer
- Monique Williams – vocals (background)

== Charts ==
Chart (2007)	Peak position
Argentine Albums (CAPIF)	7
Australian Albums (ARIA)	46
Austrian Albums (Ö3 Austria)	35
Belgian Albums (Ultratop Flanders)	36
Belgian Albums (Ultratop Wallonia)	18
Canadian Albums (Nielsen SoundScan)	13
Dutch Albums (Album Top 100)	24
French Albums (SNEP)	28
German Albums (Offizielle Top 100)	41
Greek Albums (IFPI)	2
Hungarian Albums (MAHASZ)	17
Italian Albums (FIMI)	10
Japanese Albums (Oricon)	6
Mexican Albums (Top 100 Mexico)	36
Polish Albums (ZPAV)	31
Scottish Albums (Official Charts)	41
Spanish Albums (Promusicae)	21
Swedish Albums (Sverigetopplistan)	59
Swiss Albums (Schweizer Hitparade)	6
UK Albums (Official Charts)	24
UK R&B Albums (Official Charts)	6
US Billboard 200	12
US Digital Albums	12
US Top R&B/Hip-Hop Albums (Billboard)	7

== Certifications ==
Region	Certification	Certified units/sales
Russia (NFPF)	2× Platinum	40,000^{*}
^{*} Sales figures based on certification alone.
