= Me Haces Falta =

Single by Jennifer Lopez

from the album Como Ama una Mujer
- English title: "I Need You"
- A-side: "Do It Well"
- Released: March 23, 2007
- Studio: Midnight Blue Studios (Miami, Florida)
- Genre: Latin pop
- Length: 3:37
- Label: Epic
- Songwriters: Marc Anthony; Estéfano
- Producers: Marc Anthony; Estéfano

Jennifer Lopez singles chronology
"Qué Hiciste" (2007)	"Me Haces Falta" (2007)	"Do It Well" (2007)

Music video
- "Me Haces Falta" on YouTube

"Me Haces Falta" (English: I Miss You) is a song recorded by American singer Jennifer Lopez for her fifth studio album, Como Ama una Mujer (2007). It was written and produced by Marc Anthony and Estéfano. The song was released on March 23, 2007 by Epic Records as the second and final single from the album. "Me Haces Falta" is a Latin pop song about self-loathing. Its instrumentation consists of drums, cello, bass and guitar.

Music critics were complimentary to the song's lyrics and to Lopez's vocals, but dismissed its production. An accompanying music video for the song was directed by Sanji. The video portrays Lopez as an undercover FBI agent who surrenders her lover to the police and has regrets afterwards. "Me Haces Falta" was included in the set list of Lopez's co-headlining tour with Anthony in 2007.

== Background ==
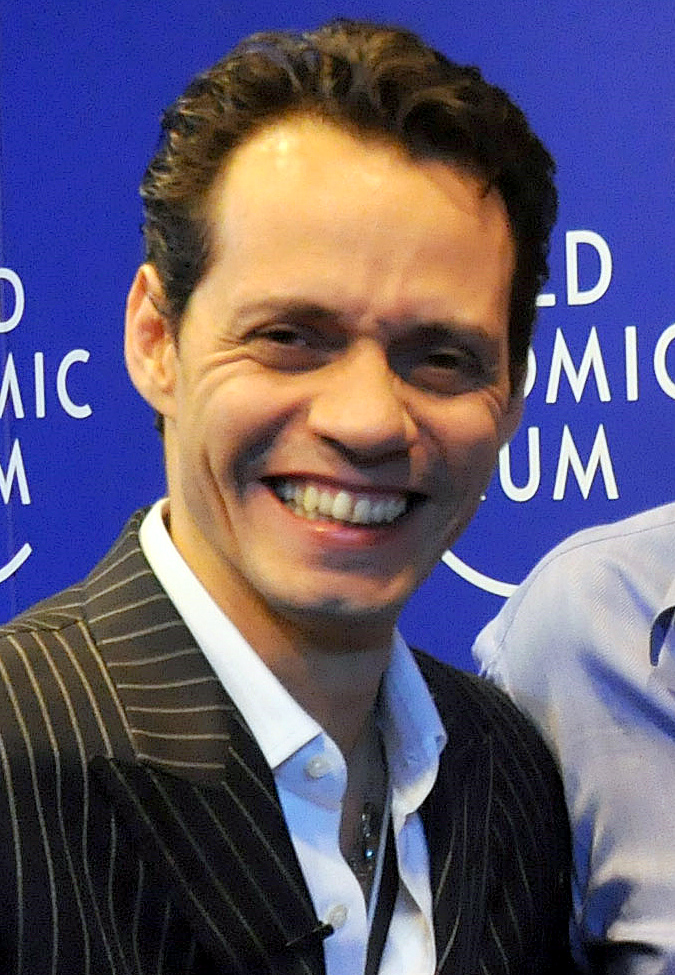
Lopez's husband Marc Anthony inspired her to record a Spanish album. He co-produced the majority of the album, alongside Estéfano.

Plans for Lopez to release a Spanish language album materialized in 2004, when Lopez's then-husband Marc Anthony was finishing up production of his ninth studio album Amar Sin Mentiras (2004) with Estéfano and Julio Reyes. Lopez went into the recording studio with them to record a song entitled "Escapémonos", as a duet with Anthony. She enjoyed working on the song so much that she decided to record a full-length Spanish album; something she had wanted to do for years. Prior to breaking out into the music scene in May 1999 with her single "If You Had My Love", Lopez always pictured her music career to be in Spanish. According to Lopez: "My life took a different turn, which was great for me. But my heart was always kind of on the Spanish side." Before recording began for her first Spanish album, Lopez recorded and released her fourth English studio album Rebirth (2005).

In early 2006 it was announced that Lopez would release her first Spanish album and her fifth studio album Como Ama una Mujer later that year. The album was produced by Anthony, Estéfano and Reyes over a span of three years. According to Estéfano, Como Ama una Mujer will "prove critics wrong" from its "big songs that require a voice"; referring to the critics about Lopez having a "limited" vocal tone. The album was released on March 27, 2007 in the United States, preceding the release of its lead single "Qué Hiciste" in January. Como Ama una Mujer received mixed reviews from music critics. At Metacritic, which assigns a normalized rating out of 100 to reviews from mainstream critics, the album received an average score of 45, based on 7 reviews, which indicates "mixed or average reviews". "Me Haces Falta" was announced to be the album's second single and was released digitally in select countries on March 23, 2007, such as Austria, Canada and Italy. It was then serviced to radio on the week of June 29, 2007. The song was later included as a B-side to "Do It Well", the lead single from Lopez's sixth studio album Brave (2007), in September 2007.

== Music and lyrics ==
"Me Haces Falta"
A 20-second sample of the song's chorus, which was noted by James Reed of The Boston Globe to be self-loathing.

"Me Haces Falta" is a Latin pop ballad, with a length of three minutes and thirty-seven seconds (3:37). Its instrumentation consists of drums, cello, bass and guitar. Estéfano wrote the lyrics to "Me Haces Falta", while Anthony composed its music. Both co-produced the song together, while Julio Reyes provided the arrangement. Bruce Swedien and Peter Wade recorded Lopez's vocals for the song at Midnight Blue Studios in Miami, Florida, while its mixing was done by Reyes and Swedien.

According to Lopez, the song is about missing someone terribly; "someone who is missing someone so much and has done something so wrong to the person that they know they can't fix it. So they just hate themselves right in that moment, they can't stand [it], they regret everything that they did and they wish they could change things." James Reed of The Boston Globe noted the chorus of "Me Haces Falta" to be self-loathing, with the lines: "Tú me haces falta/Sí, me arrepiento/Me odio/Estoy desesperada" (English: "I miss you/Yes, I repent/I hate myself/I'm desperate"). Chris Willman of Entertainment Weekly praised the song's lyrics, but dismissed the song's production, stating that it does not live up the song's "florid, romance-novel lyrics".

== Music video ==
The music video for "Me Haces Falta" was shot over a period of two days in Los Angeles, California by Sanji with the production company Reactor Films. During an interview with MTV News, Lopez described the video by saying: "Basically they are getting to know each other and kind of falling for each other, and in this video, it's not a good thing, as you'll see how it ends up." The music video was made available for purchase on the iTunes Store on July 17, 2007.

The clip opens with Lopez and her love interest conversing on the side walk in front of a shop window. These scenes are intercut with that of suspicious men in a van, observing Lopez and her lover. Later, Lopez and her lover split and she starts singing as she walks down the street. She goes inside a boutique and enters through at a secret door. As she enters, she takes off a wig and changes her clothing. She enters in a room where there are pictures of her lover scattered across a table. These scenes are intercut with scenes of Lopez and her lover laying in a grass. As the video progresses, Lopez is seen sad, accompanied with her love interest and his friend in an apartment; they are observing from a window with binoculars. It is revealed that the men from the beginning of the video are FBI officers and they are entering the building abruptly. They break into Lopez and her lover's apartment and arrest him. In the end, it is revealed that Lopez is an undercover FBI agent who surrenders her boyfriend.

== Credits and personnel ==
Credits adapted from the liner notes of Como Ama una Mujer.

Technical

- "Me Haces Falta" was recorded at Midnight Blue Studios in Miami, Florida.

Personnel

- Songwriting – Estéfano
- Production – Marc Anthony
- Recording engineers – Bruce Swedien, Peter Wade
- Mixing engineers – Bruce Swedien, Julio Reyes
- Assistant engineers – Sebastían de Peyrecave, Pedro Namerow
- Arrangement, programming – Julio Reyes
- Drums – Ricardo "Tiki" Pasillas
- Bass – Erben Perez
- Guitars – Mario Guini
- Keyboards – Julio Reyes
- Strings – Julio Reyes
- Cello – Wells Cunningham
- Background vocals – Marc Anthony, Estéfano, Vicky Echeverri
- Art direction – Julian Peploe
- Photography – Tony Duran
