= Do It Well =

2007 single by Jennifer Lopez

Single by Jennifer Lopez

from the album Brave
- Released: August 21, 2007
- Recorded: November 2006
- Studio: Record Plant (Los Angeles, CA)
- Genre: Pop; hip-pop
- Length: 3:07
- Label: Epic
- Songwriters: Ryan Tedder; Leonard Caston; Anita Poree; Frank Wilson
- Producer: Ryan Tedder

Jennifer Lopez singles chronology
"Me Haces Falta" (2007)	"Do It Well" (2007)	"Hold It Don't Drop It" (2007)

Music video
- "Do It Well" on YouTube

"Do It Well" is a song recorded by American singer Jennifer Lopez for her sixth studio album, Brave (2007). It was written and produced by Ryan Tedder, with Leonard Caston, Anita Poree, and Frank Wilson receiving writing credits for the sample of Eddie Kendrick's "Keep on Truckin". It features additional vocal production from Cory Rooney. "Do It Well" is a pop song featuring influences by disco and hip hop music. It received mostly favorable reviews from music critics, who complimented its anthemic vibe, though some criticized its "recycled" production.

Commercially, the song fared well worldwide, reaching the top twenty in over eleven countries and even peaking at top-ten positions in Hungary and Italy, while reaching the top-forty on the US Billboard Hot 100 chart. The music video directed by David LaChapelle finds Lopez rescuing a little boy who is forced to work in the kitchen of an S&M nightclub. To promote the record, Lopez performed it in many television shows, while also adding the song on the setlist of her tours, Jennifer Lopez & Marc Anthony en Concierto (2007) and Dance Again World Tour (2012).

== Background ==
Whilst having success with her fourth studio album's lead single, "Get Right", on the charts, sales of Rebirth (2005) were generally lower than expected, which lead Lopez to return to studio quickly afterwards. The singer was recording both her fifth and sixth studio album, one in Spanish, and one in English, respectively. While on set of the video from the Spanish album's second single, Lopez defined the English album as "more of what people and my fans are used to -- you know, just kind of a dance, funk, R&B, hip-hop, all that stuff, all mixed up together to make some great pop music." She also teased the first single off the project to be released in the summer of 2007.

In July 2007, "Hold It, Don't Drop It" was announced as the lead single of the project, however two weeks later, "Do It Well" was announced as the album's first single, alongside "Hold It Don't Drop It". Ultimately, only "Do It Well" was released, impacting radio stations in New York and Los Angeles on July 13, 2007, and the rest of the United States stations on August 21, 2007. Different versions of its CD single were issued, one containing "Me Haces Falta" (the last single from her previous album), other having both "Me Haces Falta" and "Como Ama Una Mujer" (the title track from her Spanish album). A remix featuring American rapper Ludacris was also released on both Vinyl single and as a bonus track of Brave.

== Composition ==
"Do It Well" was written and produced by Ryan Tedder, with Leonard Caston, Anita Poree and Frank Wilson receiving writing credits for the sample of Eddie Kendrick's number-one single "Keep on Truckin' (1973). Cory Rooney was responsible for additional vocal production, with instruments and programming being handled by Tedder as well. The song is performed in the key of F minor with a tempo of 108 beats per minute. It is a pop song containing hip hop drum beats and disco sirens at the bridge. In the chorus, she sings to someone who caught her eye: "I ain't ever met a man like that / I ain't ever fell so far, so fast / You can turn me on, throw me off track / Boy you do it, do it / you do it, do it, well".

== Critical response ==
Critics opined favorably over the song, though it received less enthusiastic reviews as well. Chuck Taylor from Billboard magazine stated that the song is "a satisfying, flamethrowing pop–urban pearl," stating: "Not since 'Waiting for Tonight' has she served up a song with such potential to rally long-term play." Alex Fletcher from Digital Spy gave to the song 4 out of 5 stars, commenting that "It's brassy, sassy, (although certainly not classy) and it's here to replace Beyoncé's 'Crazy In Love' as everyone's favourite guilty dancefloor pleasure. Caryn Ganz from Rolling Stone wrote that "the track is her salvation on the album, since is the only track that lets J. Lo do her thing: dance." Nathan S. from "DJ Booth" deemed it as an "ass-shaking masterpiece she's wisely chosen as her first single. The tracks got that "classic" J-Lo feel, huge strings and horns pared over funk-based percussion, with just a dash of Latin flavor thrown in. It is as epic as a song designed for moving in the club can be, even if the song's about two-third's incredible production, one-third J-Lo's singing." Dan Gennoe from Yahoo! Music wrote that the song "may not be prime club material, but they all come with choruses and grooves guaranteed to make the housework go with a swing."

On the other hand, Michael Slezak from Entertainment Weekly wrote a mixed review, writing that "it finds Lopez's voice as tinny and feeble as ever, singing lyrics that may have sounded believable back in the early ’90s days of In Living Color, but now come off as a preposterous attempt to 'keep it real'." But he praised "the melody's as easy as it is catchy (perfect as "Jenny from the Block" for inebriated karaoke), and the beat demands a sumptuous choreographical feast of a video." A writer from Yahoo! Music wrote a negative review, stating that the song "sounds dated and recycled." Eric Henderson from Slant Magazine wrote that the song "is a fairly imaginative reworking of one of the many string breaks from Eddie Kendricks's "Keep On Truckin'."

== Commercial performance ==
"Do It Well" debuted at number 53 on the Billboard Hot 100 chart on the week of October 6, 2007. The following week, it climbed one position, cracking the top fifty in its third week. It went on to peak at number 31 on the following week, becoming Lopez's 12th U.S. top 40 single. "Do It Well" has sold 538,000 paid digital downloads in the United States as of June 2013. Elsewhere, the song fared better, reaching the top-twenty in over eleven countries. In the United Kingdom, "Do It Well" debuted at number 34 on the UK Singles Chart week of October 6, 2007, climbing to its peak position, number 11, the following week. It remained at the top-twenty for two other weeks, becoming her seventeenth top-twenty hit.

In Australia, it debuted at its peak position, number 18, becoming her sixteenth top-twenty hit. In Belgium (Wallonia), Ireland, Netherlands, Norway, Poland, Scotland and Switzerland, the song also reached the top-twenty. It was also a commercial success in both Hungary and Italy, reaching respectively numbers 6 and 2. In Italy, it went on to debut at number 2, becoming Lopez's seventh top-ten hit, remaining at the top ten for other three consecutive weeks.

== Music video ==
On August 8, 2007, it was announced that Lopez will be shooting a video for her new single "Do It Well" in Los Angeles on August 16–17. The video debuted on MTV's TRL on September 17, 2007, on BET's 106 & Park on September 19, 2007, and at number ten on VH1 Top 20 Video Countdown on September 22, 2007. It has since climbed to number three on the former and number five on the latter. It premiered on the Indian broadcast of VH1 on October 1, 2007.

The video, directed by David LaChapelle, starts with Lopez walking down a street when she gets a message with a video on her PDA which is an SOS from a little boy captured and forced to work in the kitchen of an S&M nightclub on Union Street. She enters the club, pushing a doorman down the stairs after he questions her. She continues through the crowd, entering rooms looking for witnesses to the boy's whereabouts. She questions people and punches and slaps them to get information. While this is going on, there are scenes of Lopez dancing in a red dress and she does a dance routine in the breakdown. In the end she finally finds the little boy and as they leave another doorman bothers her. Lopez responds by kicking him over the banister. Then she and the little boy leave together.

== Live performances ==
"Do It Well" was heavily promoted with performances of the song occurring during the Good Morning America Summer Concert Series, Late Show with David Letterman, Fashion Rocks 2007, Saturday Night Divas and Dancing with the Stars. It was also included on her tours Jennifer Lopez & Marc Anthony en Concierto (2007) and Dance Again World Tour (2012).

== Track listing ==
- 12" vinyl
1. "Do It Well" (album version) – 3:07
2. "Do It Well" (a cappella version) – 3:05
3. "Do It Well" (featuring Ludacris) – 3:34
4. "Do It Well" (instrumental version) – 3:04
- Walmart CD single
1. "Do It Well" – 3:10
2. "Waiting for Tonight" – 4:08
3. "If You Had My Love" – 4:28
4. "Love Don't Cost a Thing" – 3:43
5. "Get Right" – 3:48
6. "Qué Hiciste" – 4:58
- Ringle single
1. "Do It Well" – 3:07
2. "Qué Hiciste" (salsa remix) – 4:49
3. "Qué Hiciste" (Tony Moran radio mix) – 4:34
- German basic CD single
1. "Do It Well" – 3:07
2. "Me Haces Falta" – 3:37
- Australian CD single / German premium CD single
1. "Do It Well" – 3:07
2. "Me Haces Falta" – 3:37
3. "Como Ama una Mujer" – 6:01
4. "Me Haces Falta" (video)

== Charts ==
=== Weekly charts ===
Chart (2007–2008)	Peak position
Australia (ARIA)	18
Australian Urban (ARIA)	5
Austria (Ö3 Austria Top 40)	34
Belgium (Ultratop 50 Flanders)	22
Belgium (Ultratop 50 Wallonia)	20
Canada Hot 100 (Billboard)	23
Canada CHR/Top 40 (Billboard)	49
Canada Hot AC (Billboard)	48
CIS Airplay (TopHit)	42
Europe (Eurochart Hot 100)	13
France (SNEP)	29
Germany (GfK)	30
Global Dance Tracks (Billboard)	12
Greece Digital Songs (Billboard)	4
Hungary (Rádiós Top 40)	6
Ireland (IRMA)	13
Italy (FIMI)	2
Netherlands (Dutch Top 40)	30
Netherlands (Single Top 100)	17
Norway (VG-lista)	20
Poland Airplay (ZPAV)	14
Romania (Romanian Top 100)	41
Russia Airplay (TopHit)	58
Scottish Singles Sales (Official Charts)	11
Sweden (Sverigetopplistan)	54
Switzerland (Schweizer Hitparade)	12
UK Singles (Official Charts)	11
UK Hip Hop/R&B (Official Charts)	4
US Billboard Hot 100	31
US Pop Airplay (Billboard)	37
US Hot R&B/Hip-Hop Songs (Billboard)	99
US Dance Club Songs (Billboard)	1

=== Year-end charts ===
Chart (2007)	Position
Brazil (Crowley)	69
CIS (TopHit)	117
Russia Airplay (TopHit)	185
UK Singles (OCC)	171
UK Urban (Music Week)	21

== Release history ==
Release dates and formats for "Do It Well"
Region	Date	Format	Label	Ref.
United States	August 21, 2007	Contemporary hit radio; rhythmic radio	Epic	
DACH	September 21, 2007	CD single; maxi single	Sony BMG	
United States	September 25, 2007	12" single	Epic	
Australia	October 1, 2007	CD single	Sony BMG	

== See also ==
- List of number-one dance singles of 2007 (U.S.)
