= Como Ama una Mujer =

Studio album by Jennifer Lopez
- Released: March 23, 2007
- Recorded: 2004–2007
- Studios: Record Plant (Los Angeles, CA); Midnight Blue Studios (Miami, FL); Sony Music Studios (New York, NY); Angel Recording Studios (London, England)
- Genres: Latin pop; Latin
- Length: 49:57
- Label: Epic
- Producers: Marc Anthony; Estéfano; Julio Reyes Copello

Jennifer Lopez chronology
Rebirth (2005)	Como Ama una Mujer (2007)	Brave (2007)

Singles from Como Ama una Mujer
- 1. "Qué Hiciste" Released: January 26, 2007; 2. "Me Haces Falta" Released: March 23, 2007

Como Ama una Mujer (English: How a Woman Loves) is the fifth studio album and first Spanish album by American singer and actress Jennifer Lopez. It was released on March 23, 2007, by Epic Records. After including some Spanish songs on her first two albums, Lopez initially became interested in recording a full-length studio album in 2004 when she recorded a song with her then-husband Marc Anthony for his ninth studio album. After releasing her fourth studio album, Rebirth (2005), Lopez started working heavily on the album with Anthony, Estéfano and Julio Reyes Copello in a period of two and a half years. Composed entirely of ballads (and the exception of a few other genres), Como Ama una Mujer talks about love and heartbreak, being organic in its instrumentation and introspective in its lyrics.

The album was given a mixed reception from music critics, with many praising her vocals for being more improved than her previous records, but thought the album was too serious and questioned a lack of highlights within the album. Commercially, the album debuted inside the top ten of the US Billboard 200 and marked the highest first-week sales for an artist's debut Spanish album. Elsewhere, it topped the Switzerland charts and became a top-ten album in eight other countries.

Two singles were released from the album: "Qué Hiciste" and "Me Haces Falta". The first was released on January 26, 2007, and became a success in many countries, reaching number-one in Italy, Spain, Switzerland and on the US Hot Latin Songs, and a top-ten hit elsewhere, while the second single was released on March 23, 2007, but was a commercial disappointment. Lopez promoted the album with a co-headlining tour with Anthony in 2007.

== Background and development ==
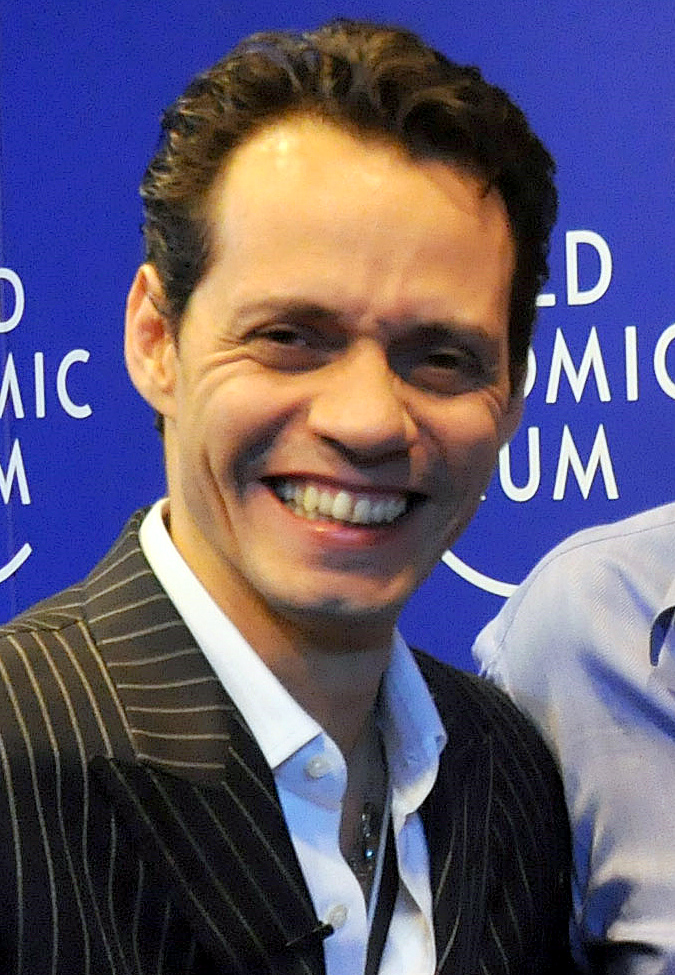
Lopez's former husband Marc Anthony inspired her to record a Spanish album and co-wrote and co-produced the majority of the record.

Prior to breaking out into the music scene in May 1999 with her single "If You Had My Love", Lopez always pictured her music career to be in Spanish. Her first demo tape was called "Vivir Sin Ti" ("To Live Without You"), however former Sony Music president Tommy Mottola persuaded Lopez to do her first album in English. According to Lopez: "My life took a different turn, which was great for me. But my heart was always kind of on the Spanish side." Later, throughout her career as a singer, she included two tracks in Spanish on her debut album, On the 6 (1999), with one being the single "No Me Ames" and five on her sophomore studio album, J.Lo (2001).

Plans for Lopez to release a full-length Spanish-language album materialized in 2004, when Lopez's then-husband Marc Anthony was finishing up production of his ninth studio album Amar Sin Mentiras (2004) with Estéfano and Julio Reyes Copello. Lopez went into the recording studio with them to record a song entitled "Escapémonos", as a duet with Anthony. She enjoyed working on the song so much that she decided to record a full-length Spanish album; something she had wanted to do for years. In the same year, she recorded a Spanish version of the song "Sway", called "Quién Será", for her film Shall We Dance? (2004), but the English version recorded by Pussycat Dolls was used instead. Before recording began for her first Spanish album, Lopez recorded and released her fourth English studio album Rebirth (2005).

In early 2006 it was announced that Lopez would release her first Spanish album and her fifth studio album Como Ama una Mujer later that year and that she worked mostly with Colombian record producer Estéfano, Reyes and Anthony. Amidst the recording process, she was also shooting a film with Anthony, El Cantante (2007) and providing vocals for its soundtrack entirely done by Anthony, as well as recording a more "urban-leaning" full-English album. According to Estéfano, Como Ama una Mujer was going to "prove critics wrong" from its "big songs that require a voice"; referring to the critics about Lopez having a "limited" vocal tone. After working on the album, Lopez said that she matured as singer, stating:

"I've matured as a singer. Marc gave me confidence in the studio as well. When someone believes in you so much, you don't want to let them down. And it's also the material. I think this material lent itself to my voice. And it actually made me approach my new English album in a different way. I have a different standard now".

== Composition and themes ==
"I love the music. I love the drama. It must be the actress in me. I love the deep, intense passionate way of expressing yourself in those kinds of songs. And it's really not something that lends itself to English music, and not something I'd been able to tap into before."

— Lopez on the difference between the album and her English-language records.

Como Ama una Mujer is mostly composed by songs written by Estéfano, Julio Reyes Copello and Marc Anthony. Despite the fact that she speaks Spanish, Lopez didn't write any song on the album. However, she wanted to make sure she was expressing everything accurately. She said: "You have to have a total command of the language, so I couldn’t write it all myself, you know what I mean?. I had to really depend on people to express what I was feeling." Lopez also emphasized that she really expressed to the writers the kind of album she wanted to make and the things that were important for her. She explained: "I would say, 'This songs needs to be about a person, and when he's leaving,' and they would turn around and write in Spanish." She also declared that, emotionally speaking, the album was closer to who she was than any album she had ever done.

Como Ama una Mujer is a mainstream, traditional Latin pop album, composed mostly of romantic ballads, differing from her previous urban sounds as well as the rhythmic Latin pop vibe heard that year. It is also known for being "organic in its instrumentation and introspective in its lyrics." The first song written for the album was "Por Arriesgarnos" and is a duet with Marc Anthony. Initially, the song wasn't intend to be a duet, with Lopez remarking that "there was a background male voice, and Marc did the backups. I asked to put his voice up, because I think the harmony parts blended so beautifully." Meanwhile, when the album was almost done, the song "Qué Hiciste" was a last minute addition and was born after a dream Anthony had with late singer Rocío Jurado. Lopez explained: "Marc woke up and said, ’I just had the craziest dream.' 'What was the dream?' And he said, 'Rocío Jurado was in this room and she was saying', 'Come here, get in this room right now, listen to this. This song is for Jennifer,' and she was singing a melody.'" Then, since she had not studio equipment nearby to capture the essence of the song, she took her phone, called up their answering machine and told him to sing. Later, she called a Spanish writer she was working with to help her with adapting the lyrics.

== Songs ==
The album mainly deals with themes of love and heartache. "¿Qué Hiciste?" ("What Have You Done?") opens the album, and features elements of Ernesto Lecuona's Malagueña. Starting out as a ballad, the album's opening track moves into a Latin rock sound, becoming one of the few uptempo tracks on the record. Lyrically, the song talks about a very intense relationship and how she feels heartbroken with a lover who unraveled her happy home. Lopez remarked that she told Reyes that she wanted a song with a woman saying to her former lover: "What have you done with our relationship? With our life? We had everything and with your own hands, you destroyed our house." "Me Haces Falta" ("I Miss You") talks about missing someone so badly and feeling desperate and it also has rock influences. The title track, the delicate ballad "Como Ama una Mujer" ("How a Woman Loves"), opens with piano and a minor-chord progression that was compared to Randy Newman's "In Germany Before the War" and a melodic chorus which was noted for being similar to Kenny Rogers' "She Believes in Me". The fourth track, "Te Voy a Querer" ("I Will Love You") is a cumbia flavored track.

"¿Por qué te Marchas?" ("Why You Leave?") is a Spanish version of "Can't Believe This Is Me", a "dramatic" ballad from her previous album Rebirth (2005). It features swelling strings in its chorus and it was highlighted for containing strong vocals by Lopez and lyrics about heartbreak. "Por Arriesgarnos" ("By Risking") is a duet with Anthony about love and the risks that two people in love run. "Tú" ("You") is an Italian pop song and it features the London Symphony Orchestra. According to Lopez, "It was an emotion I had about wanting to sing that to a child one day. That's where the song was born from. To sing it to my own child." "Amarte es Todo" ("Loving You Is Everything") and "Apresúrate" ("Hurry Up") are both romantic and passionate ballads about love, while "Sola" ("Alone") talks about recovering from a heartbreak and features traces of ambient electronica. The last track on the album is "Adiós" ("Goodbye"), a ballad about leaving someone behind and it was recorded live in front of an audience that "immediately erupts into a sing-along."

== Release and promotion ==
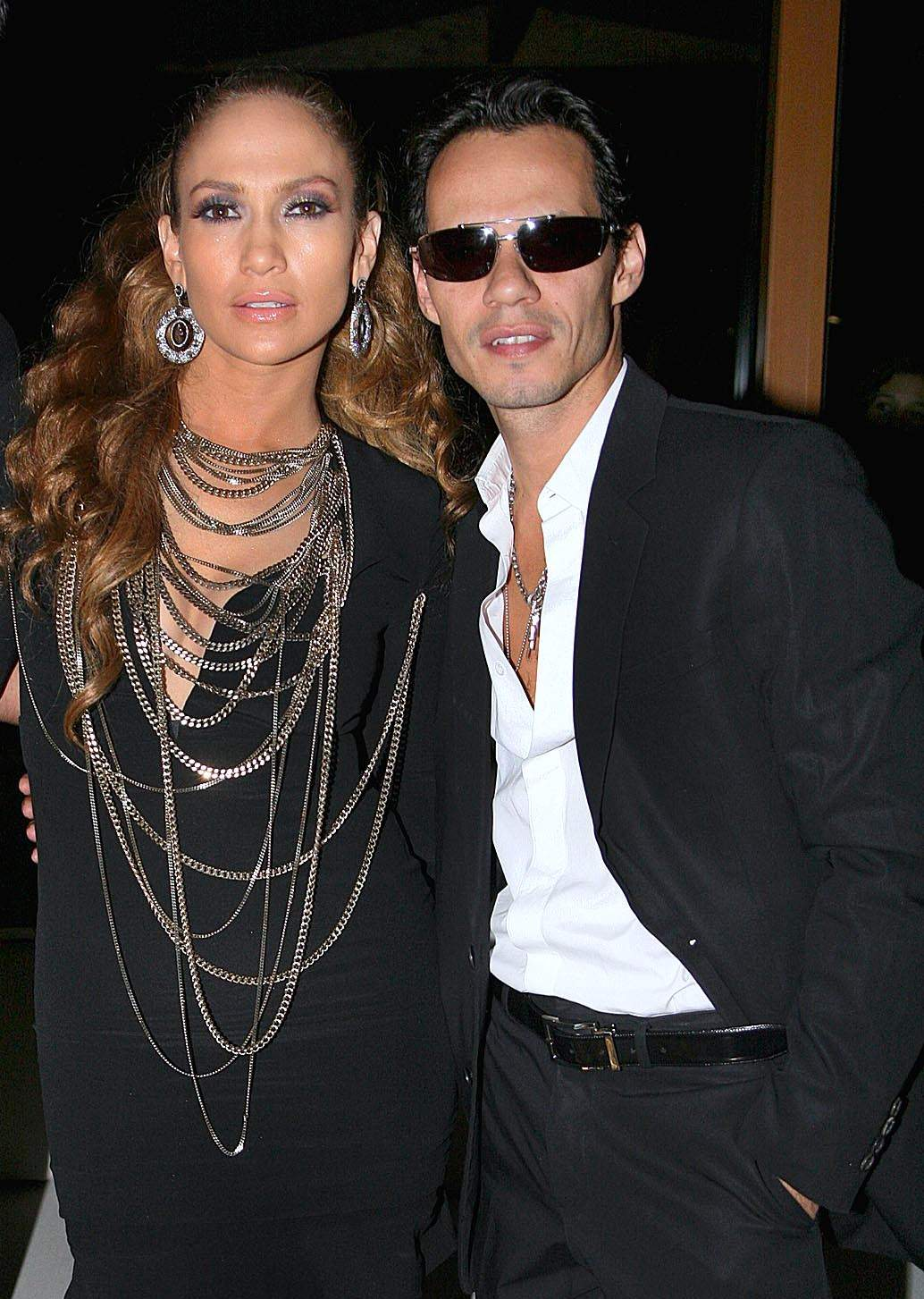
Lopez and Anthony embarked on a co-headline tour to promote the album.

In January 2007, Billboard reported that the album was going to be released on April 3, 2007, in the United States. However, the album was released a week later. The album's artwork was shot by Tony Duran, who worked with Jennifer in her previous projects. It features Lopez in a serious pose, looking down, with her hair pulled back and her hand around her neck. To promote the album, Lopez traveled back to The Bronx with Marc Athony to meet fans and sign copies of the album in a record shop in her old neighborhood with over 500 people attending it. In an interview, Lopez stated "It touches my heart to be able to bring this album back to my neighborhood, back to my home." Lopez also united with the Univision TV network to produce a five-part miniseries based on a treatment by Lopez, which was based on the content of the album, while also having the album's title. At the end of each episode, Lopez performs the theme song that inspired that episode. Lopez also promoted the album with live performances of the album's lead-single in many places, including the American Idol, while also doing the Walmart Soundcheck, where she performed "Qué Hiciste", "Tú", "Por Arriesgarnos" (with Marc Anthony), "Como Ama Una Mujer", "Porque te Marchas" and "Te voy a Querer". To further promote the album, Lopez embarked on a co-headline tour with Anthony through September and November in 2007.

=== Singles ===
"Qué Hiciste" was released as the album's lead-single on January 26, 2007. It became a huge success on the charts, reaching number-one in four countries, including Italy, Spain, Switzerland and the United States, where it topped the Billboard Hot Latin Songs. Elsewhere, the song managed to reach either the top-ten or the top-twenty. The music video for the song was released on February 5, 2007, on MTV. "Me Haces Falta" was released as the album's second and final single on March 23, 2007. Its music video was released on July 17, 2007, however, the song failed to chart.

== Critical reception ==
Professional ratings
Aggregate scores
Source	Rating
Metacritic	45/100
Review scores
Source	Rating
AllMusic	2/5 stars
Billboard	(positive)
The Boston Globe	(positive)
Entertainment Weekly	C+
People	2.5/4 stars
Q	1/5 stars
Slant Magazine	2/5 stars
Sputnikmusic	2/5 stars
Vibe	2/5 stars

Como Ama una Mujer received mixed reviews from most contemporary music critics. At Metacritic, which assigns a normalized rating out of 100 to reviews from mainstream critics, the album received an average score of 45 based on 7 reviews. In a favorable analysis, Leila Cobo of Billboard noted that "Dovetailing with her choice of sound and arrangements that straddle convention and invention, Lopez mines new emotional depths. It certainly helps that she has the vocal chops needed to interpret material that is often quite demanding." James Reed was also positive in his review for Boston Globe, calling it "Lopez's most tasteful and reserved album yet." He emphasized that Lopez "opt[ed] for string sections over canned synthesizers" and praised her vocal performance on "Porque te Marchas" and "Sóla". Chris Willman of Entertainment Weekly acknowledge that the album "does represent a victory for Lopez by offering fairly persuasive proof that, contrary to rumor, she can sing, and without a regiment of background choralists." However he noticed that "[a]ll that bulking up she’s been doing at the vocal gym isn’t enough, though, to turn flaccid torch songs into muscle." Chuck Arnold of People gave the album a rating of two-and-a-half-out-of-four-stars, and praised the "writing, production and vocal help" from Marc Anthony, who made Lopez "smoothly transforms into Jenny from the Barrio." However, he criticized the album's second half for being "dragged down by too many ballads, which, no matter what tongue they're sung in, will never be Lopez's strong suit."

In his AllMusic review, Stephen Thomas Erlewine was less favorable, calling it "music for housewives" and that "it's by far the most sedate Lopez has ever been on record." Erlewine was less negative about her vocals though, writing that "[s]he acquits herself well as a vocalist -- she never indulges in vocal gymnastics, and she can carry a tune strongly." Sal Cinquemani of Slant Magazine opined that "Lopez’s vocal shortcomings notwithstanding, she sounds surprisingly relaxed and at ease throughout [the album]," but he found a problem with the fact that, according to him, "Lopez easily ages herself by a decade or two," calling it "shockingly middle-of-the-road" and "something that’s close to Lopez’s heart, but it’s a less than shrewd move for one of pop culture’s savviest icons." While recognizing that her vocals never lack feeling or conviction, Vibe's Pete L'Official called its music "tacky and overproduced", but observed that "[t]he songwriting here far outstrips Lopez's previous albums, though." John Cruz of Sputnikmusic was negative in his review, feeling that Lopez "forgets to bring the flavor of the language itself," naming it "tepid and dull" and noting that it lacked "any sort of spice," calling it "one of the years most disappointing albums," while Q magazine labeled it "[s]loppy, emotion-free, chicken-in-a-basket ballad."

In a retrospective review for Albumism, music critic Quentin Harrison remarked positively, "The contents of the LP bridged an engaging stratum of traditional-to-contemporary Latin pop aesthetics [...]." He elaborated further regarding its legacy on Lopez's overall musical career, "[...] Como Ama una Mujer remains one of Lopez’s most consistent records, fueled by the passion and determination initially glimpsed on This Is Me…Then. That spirit has kept Jennifer Lopez as a strong presence in popular music for more than two decades."

== Commercial performance ==
Como Ama una Mujer debuted at number ten on the US Billboard 200 chart with 48,000 copies sold in its first week. This made Lopez the fifth artist to land in the top ten with a Spanish-language album, and also marked the highest first-week sales for an artist's debut Spanish album. It also topped the Billboard Latin Albums Chart for four consecutive weeks; spending 30 weeks on the chart before leaving the top 100. As of June 2013, it has sold 218,000 copies in the United States.

It also fared well in Spanish-speaking countries, such as Argentina and Spain, where it reached numbers three and two, respectively. It was also successful in non-Spanish speaking countries, such as Switzerland, where it debuted at number-one to become her second consecutive number-one album there, Italy, where it debuted at number two and became her highest-charting album, while also reaching the top-ten in Germany, Greece and Poland. As of August 2014, it has sold over 800,000 copies worldwide.

== Track listing ==
No.	Title	Lyrics	Music	Producer(s)	Length
1.	"Qué Hiciste"	Julio Reyes Copello; Jimena Romero	Reyes; Marc Anthony	Anthony; Reyes	4:57
2.	"Me Haces Falta"	Estéfano	Anthony	Anthony; Estéfano	3:37
3.	"Como Ama una Mujer"	Estéfano	Estéfano; Reyes	Anthony; Estéfano	6:01
4.	"Te Voy a Querer"	Estéfano; Pilar Quiroga; Jimmy Paredez	Estéfano; Quiroga; Paredez	Anthony; Estéfano	4:40
5.	"Porque Te Marchas"	Estéfano	Anthony	Anthony; Estéfano	4:33
6.	"Por Arriesgarnos"	Estéfano	Estéfano; Reyes	Anthony; Estéfano	3:31
7.	"Tú"	Estéfano; Anthony; Reyes	Estéfano; Anthony; Reyes	Anthony; Estéfano	4:10
8.	"Amarte es Todo"	Estéfano	Estéfano; Reyes	Anthony; Estéfano	4:00
9.	"Apresúrate"	Estéfano; José Luis Pagan	Anthony; Estéfano; Pagan	Anthony; Estéfano	5:02
10.	"Sola"	Estéfano; Reyes	Estéfano; Anthony	Anthony; Estéfano	5:17
11.	"Adiós"	Estéfano	Estéfano; Reyes	Anthony; Estéfano	4:09
Total length:					49:57

International digital edition bonus track
No.	Title	Length
12.	"Quién Será"	3:51
Total length:		53:48

== Personnel ==
- Vic Anesini – mastering
- Marc Anthony – arranger, vocals (background), producer, executive producer
- Eduardo Avena – percussion
- Odisa Beltrán – production coordination
- Andres Bermudez – mixing
- Marco Britti – drums
- Jorge Calandrelli – string arrangements
- César Castillo – quena, sikus
- José Garcia De La Rosa – engineer
- Sebastian DePeyrecave – guitar, assistant engineer
- Nailton Bispo "Meia Noiche" Dos Santos – percussion
- Tony Duran – photography
- Vicky Echeverri – vocals (background)
- Estéfano – vocals (background), producer
- Mauricio Gasca – arranger, programming and recording engineer
- Armando Gola – bass
- Mario Guini – guitar (acoustic), guitar, guitar (electric)
- Anthony Kilhoffer – engineer
- Jadi Leesley – stylist
- The London Symphony Orchestra – strings
- Jennifer Lopez – executive producer, lead vocals
- Juan José "Chaqueño" Martínez – percussion
- Pedro Namerow – assistant engineer
- José Luis Pagán – arranger, guitar (acoustic), guitar, guitar (electric), keyboards, programming, engineer
- José Luis Pagani – arranger, programming
- Ricardo Tiki Pasillas – percussion, drums, vocals (background)
- Ken Paves – hairstylist
- Julian Peploe – art direction, design
- Erben Perez – bass
- Gustavo Pichon Dal Pont – engineer
- Julio C. Reyes – accordion, arranger, conductor, engineer, keyboards, mixing, piano, producer, programming, string arrangements
- Claudia Salgado – production coordination
- Bruce Swedien – engineer, mixing
- Guillermo Vadala – bass
- Matthew Vanleeuwen – make-up
- Peter Wade – engineer, mixing

== Charts ==
=== Weekly charts ===
Chart (2007)	Peak position
Austrian Albums (Ö3 Austria)	10
Belgian Albums (Ultratop Flanders)	30
Belgian Albums (Ultratop Flanders)	12
Canadian Albums (Nielsen SoundScan)	50
Croatian International Albums (HDU)	1
Dutch Albums (Album Top 100)	31
European Albums (Billboard)	3
Finnish Albums (Suomen virallinen lista)	29
French Albums (SNEP)	11
German Albums (Offizielle Top 100)	4
Greek Albums (IFPI Greece)	5
Hungarian Albums (MAHASZ)	3
Italian Albums (FIMI)	2
Mexican Albums (AMPROFON)	8
Polish Albums (ZPAV)	9
Portuguese Albums (AFP)	12
Spanish Albums (Promusicae)	2
Swedish Albums (Sverigetopplistan)	49
Swiss Albums (Schweizer Hitparade)	1
Taiwanese Albums (Five Music)	3
US Billboard 200	10
US Billboard Top Latin Albums	1
US Billboard Latin Pop Albums	1
Venezuelan Albums (Recordland)	12

=== Monthly charts ===
Chart (2007)	Peak position
Argentine Monthly Albums (CAPIF)	11
Uruguayan Monthly Albums (CUD)	10

=== Year-end charts ===
Chart (2007)	Peak position
Belgian Albums (Wallonia)	85
European Albums (Billboard)	45
French Albums	159
German Albums	68
Hungarian Albums (MAHASZ)	76
Italian Albums	47
Spanish Albums	18
Swiss Albums	16
US Billboard Top Latin Albums	7
US Billboard Latin Pop Albums	3

== Sales and certifications ==
Region	Certification	Certified units/sales
Greece (IFPI Greece)	Platinum	15,000^{^}
Hungary (MAHASZ)	Gold	3,000^{^}
Portugal (AFP)	Gold	10,000^{^}
Russia (NFPF)	2× Platinum	40,000^{*}
Spain (Promusicae)	Platinum	80,000^{^}
Switzerland (IFPI Switzerland)	Platinum	30,000^{^}
United Kingdom	—	7,364
United States	—	218,000
Summaries
Worldwide	—	800,000
^{*} Sales figures based on certification alone.^{^} Shipments figures based on certification alone.

== See also ==
- List of number-one Billboard Top Latin Albums of 2007
