= Hold It Don't Drop It =

Single by Jennifer Lopez

from the album Brave
- Released: October 26, 2007
- Recorded: February 15, 2007
- Studio: The Poolhouse (New York, NY); Record Plant (Los Angeles, CA)
- Genre: Disco-funk, synth-pop, pop
- Length: 3:57
- Label: Epic
- Songwriters: Kevin Risto; Waynne Nugent; Jennifer Lopez; Tawanna Dabney; Allen Phillip Lees; Janet Sewell; Cynthia Lissette; Dennis Lambert; Brian Potter
- Producers: Dirty Swift; Bruce Wayyne; Cory Rooney; Philosophy

Jennifer Lopez singles chronology
| "Do It Well" (2007) | "Hold It Don't Drop It" (2007) | "This Boy's Fire" (2008) |

Music video
- "Hold It Don't Drop It" on YouTube

"Hold It Don't Drop It" is a song recorded by American singer Jennifer Lopez for her sixth studio album, Brave (2007). It was written by Kevin "Dirty Swift" Risto, Waynne "Bruce Wayyne" Nugent, Lopez, Allen Phillip Lees, Tawanna Dabney, Janet Sewell, Cynthia Lissette, Dennis Lambert, and Brian Potter. Originally planned to be released as the first single from the album, it was released as the second single on October 26, 2007.

== Background and release ==
On July 28, 2007, it was announced that "Hold It Don't Drop It" would be released as the lead single from her then-upcoming sixth studio album, Brave (2007). It was also confirmed that she would perform the song live on Fashion Rocks on September 7. Two days later, it was announced that the single would be released on October 1 in the United Kingdom. On August 7, it was revealed that "Hold It Don't Drop It" would be released alongside "Do It Well" as a double single. "Do It Well" was ultimately released as the sole lead single from the album and "Hold It Don't Drop It" was chosen to be released as the second single in select countries. It was sent to contemporary hit radio in Russia on October 26, 2007.

== Composition ==
"Hold It Don't Drop It" is a disco song with a running length of three minutes and fifty-five seconds (3:55). It was written by Kevin Risto, Waynne Nugent, Jennifer Lopez, Allen Phillip Lees, Tawanna Dabney, Janet Sewell, Cynthia Lissette and it samples the bassline from Tavares' 1975 hit "It Only Takes a Minute" written by Dennis Lambert and Brian Potter.

== Reception ==
=== Critical response ===
"Hold It Don't Drop It" received generally positive reviews from critics. Nick Levine of Digital Spy awarded the song four out of five stars, calling the song one of "the most lusty, persuasive vocals of her career" as well as noting its effect to be "bold, brash and sassy". Slant Magazine's Eric Henderson said, "the song thrashes your body mercilessly the first time, tickles your ears the second time, and compels you to track down that old "It Only Takes a Minute" vinyl by the third or fourth." Mike Joseph of PopMatters noted that the song included "sizable chunks" from "It Only Takes a Minute". Later, Slant Magazine named "Hold It Don't Drop It" the thirty-fifth best song of 2007, praising "a surprisingly agile vocal performance from La Lopez, making it the singer's best single in years".

=== Commercial performance ===
"Hold It Don't Drop It" debuted at number 22 on the Billboard Hot Dance Club Play chart on the week of September 22, 2007, as the "Hot Shot Debut".

== Music video ==
The video was shot on November 16, 2007 and directed by Melina Matsoukas. It was premiered December 4, 2007 on MTV Europe and MTV Turkey. Lopez was pregnant when the video was filmed.

In the video, Lopez starts off by dancing in a spotlight wearing a hat, flipping between close-ups of her face and of her sitting on top of a giant silver disco ball. Lopez is then standing with a microphone stand in a white room on podiums with three male back-up dancers in suits lined behind her. When the chorus lines kick in, the lights above and below the soundstage flash and when Lopez is singing, she occasionally picks up the mic stand to sing into it and waves it above her head. There are also scenes of her singing in the spotlight into a mic hanging down and of Lopez sitting on a white chair facing away from camera.

== Track listings ==
Hold It Don't Drop It – CD single, digital download (2-track)
| No. | Title | Length |
|---|---|---|
| 1. | "Hold It Don't Drop It" (Album Version) | 3:57 |
| 2. | "Hold It Don't Drop It" (Moto Blanco Club Mix) | 8:35 |
| Total length: | | 12:32 |

Hold It Don't Drop It – Digital download (4-track)
| No. | Title | Length |
|---|---|---|
| 1. | "Hold It Don't Drop It" (Album Version) | 3:57 |
| 2. | "Hold It Don't Drop It" (Moto Blanco Radio Mix) | 3:16 |
| 3. | "Hold It Don't Drop It" (Moto Blanco Club Mix) | 8:35 |
| 4. | "Hold It Don't Drop It" (Moto Blanco Dub Mix) | 7:46 |
| Total length: | | 23:34 |

Hold It Don't Drop It – CD maxi single
| No. | Title | Length |
|---|---|---|
| 1. | "Hold It Don't Drop It" (Album Version) | 3:57 |
| 2. | "Hold It Don't Drop It" (Moto Blanco Radio Mix) | 3:16 |
| 3. | "Hold It Don't Drop It" (Moto Blanco Club Mix) | 8:35 |
| 4. | "Hold It Don't Drop It" (Moto Blanco Dub Mix) | 7:46 |
| 5. | "Hold It Don't Drop It" (music video) |

== Charts ==
=== Weekly charts ===
Weekly chart performance for "Hold It Don't Drop It"
| Chart (2007–2008) | Peak position |
|---|---|
| Global Dance Tracks (Billboard) | 32 |
| Hungary (Rádiós Top 40) | 33 |
| Italy (Musica e dischi) | 4 |
| Netherlands (Dutch Top 40 Tipparade) | 10 |
| Russia Airplay (TopHit) | 24 |
| UK Singles (Official Charts) | 72 |
| US Dance Club Songs (Billboard) | 1 |
| US Dance/Mix Show Airplay (Billboard) | 15 |

=== Year-end charts ===
Year-end chart performance for "Hold It Don't Drop It"
| Chart (2008) | Position |
|---|---|
| Russia Airplay (TopHit) | 126 |

== Release history ==
Release dates and formats for "Hold It Don't Drop It"
| Region | Date | Format | Version | Label | Ref. |
|---|---|---|---|---|---|
| Russia | October 26, 2007 | Contemporary hit radio | Album | Sony BMG | |
| Russia | November 20, 2007 | Contemporary hit radio | Moto Blanco radio edit | Sony BMG | |
| Germany | January 4, 2008 | Digital download | Album; Moto Blanco remixes | Sony BMG | |
| United Kingdom | January 4, 2008 | Digital download | Album; Moto Blanco remixes | Sony BMG | |
| United Kingdom | January 7, 2008 | Digital download | Album; Moto Blanco remixes | Sony BMG | |
| Germany | January 11, 2008 | CD single | Album; Moto Blanco remixes | Sony BMG | |

== See also ==
- List of number-one dance singles of 2007 (U.S.)
