= Qué Hiciste =

2007 single by Jennifer Lopez

Single by Jennifer Lopez

from the album Como Ama una Mujer
- Language: Spanish
- English title: "What Did You Do"
- Released: January 26, 2007
- Recorded: 2006
- Studio: Record Plant, Los Angeles
- Genre: Latin rock; R&B
- Length: 4:58 (album version) 4:31 (radio edit)
- Label: Epic
- Songwriters: Marc Anthony; Julio Reyes Copello; Jimena Romero
- Producers: Marc Anthony; Julio Reyes Copello

Jennifer Lopez singles chronology
"Control Myself" (2006)	"Qué Hiciste" (2007)	"Me Haces Falta" (2007)

Music video
- "Qué Hiciste" on YouTube

"Qué Hiciste" (English: What Have You Done) is a song recorded by American singer Jennifer Lopez for her fifth studio album, Como Ama una Mujer (2007). It was written and produced by Marc Anthony and Julio Reyes Copello, with additional writing from Jimena Romero. "Qué Hiciste" became a commercial success for Lopez, appearing in a wide range of charts around the world. The song became her first Spanish-language song to chart inside the Billboard Hot 100, reaching a peak position of eighty-six. It also peaked atop of Billboard's Hot Dance Club Play and Hot Latin Tracks charts. The song additionally reached the top position in Italy and in Switzerland. Lopez performed the song on American Idol on April 11, 2007; becoming the first artist ever to perform a Spanish song on the show.

== Music and lyrics ==
"Qué Hiciste" is a Latin rock and R&B song, with a length of four minutes and fifty-eight seconds (4:58). The song was written by Jimena Romero, Julio Reyes Copello, Marc Anthony, and produced by Estéfano and Reyes. The song marked the beginning of a musical project that lasted for three years and was originally conceived from a dream that Anthony had with Spanish recording artist Rocío Jurado two weeks after the singer's death. According to him, Jurado asked him to listen to a piece of music, which turned out to be the primary melody for the song. He elaborated that, within the dream, Jurado told him that the song, yet to be titled, was exclusively "for Jennifer." Lopez revealed that as Anthony did not want to forget the lyrics, and without any studio equipment nearby, she grabbed her phone, called up her answering machine and asked her husband to sing the melody. She also revealed that, with the help of a composer, "Que Hiciste" was finished in a couple of weeks. After a few months, Lopez started to write the lyrics with a Spanish songwriter, and finished it in fifteen minutes. Lopez asserted that recording a song in her parents' language was "a dream come true" for her.

The song was originally meant to be a ballad. However, as the lyrics were being written, "Qué Hiciste" turned into "something harder, with a bit more of a rock tinge to it. It's an incredibly intense song. [...] It's passionate and a lot of fun, with a killer message." Lopez claimed she loves the song, "and I hope other people love it as much as I do." James Reed of The Boston Globe noted the song to be a "diva-mode kiss-off" of a lover who "unraveled her happy home", noting the lyrics: "Se te olvidó que era el amor lo que importaba/ Y con tus manos derrumbaste nuestra casa" ("You forgot that it was love that mattered/ And with your hands you tore down our home"). He concluded by stating "that's about all the trash-talking Lopez wants to do". Two months later, Lopez and Anthony re-recorded the song in salsa which was produced by Anthony's longtime producer Sergio George in The Hit Factory Criteria studio in Miami. George commented that his years of experience with Anthony made the task "easier and the result, extraordinary".

== Critical response and accolades ==
Tijana Ilich of About.com gave a positive review of the song, stating that if the rest of Como Ama una Mujer is as good as "Qué Hiciste", "it's going to mean another big hit for Lopez". James Reed of The Boston Globe called "Qué Hiciste" a detour on "an otherwise lush, quiet album". Sal Cinquemani of Slant Magazine expressed his disappointment in Como Ama una Mujer lacking a "Latin booty-shaker" song, citing "Qué Hiciste" as "the closest we get".

On the Billboard Latin Music Awards of 2008, "Qué Hiciste" received a nomination for Latin Pop Airplay Song of the Year which was awarded to "Eres Para Mí" by Julieta Venegas. The song received a Broadcast Music, Inc. Awards of 2008, the song received a BMI Latin award.

== Commercial performance ==
"Qué Hiciste" became a commercial success for Lopez, appearing in a wide range of charts around the world. The song became her first Spanish-language song to chart inside the Billboard Hot 100, reaching a peak position of eighty-six. Additionally, the song became a hit on several other Billboard charts, including top positions at the Latin Songs and Hot Dance Club Play charts. Apart from the United States, the song appeared in several European national charts. In Italy, "Qué Hiciste" debuted atop the national chart on the week ending March 15, 2007, and stayed atop the chart for two consecutive weeks before dropping to number five. In Switzerland, the song debuted at number one on the week ending March 25, 2007. The following week, the song fell to number two, only to regain its peak position atop the chart on its first week before slowly dropping from the chart, where it stayed for 32 weeks. In Germany, "Qué Hiciste" managed to reach the top ten, peaking at number ten. In Belgium, the song reached number thirteen in Flanders and eleven in Wallonia. Finally, it reached the nineteenth position of the charts in Austria. The ringtone of the song managed to reach number one in Portugal.

== Promotion and music video ==
The music video premiered on MTV on February 5, 2007.

The clip opens with Lopez driving an old car down a dusty highway in the middle of the desert, leaning out of the window singing. She pulls over at a gas station and enters the bathroom to change clothes. She is then seen dancing in the desert with flames in front and behind her. The view cuts between this and Lopez changing into new clothes and dying her hair at the washbasin. She then continues driving, but this time across the desert sand, away from the highway. She stops and gets a can of gasoline out the trunk, then pours it over the car. The car then explodes behind Lopez as she walks away. She is then seen dancing in a change of clothes in the sand, cutting between her back in the car and in the desert with the flames.

On April 11, 2007, Lopez performed "Qué Hiciste" on American Idol. She became the first artist to perform a Spanish-language song in the show's history. The performance featured a heavy use of a smoke machine and was introduced with a montage of outtakes from Lopez's stint on the show the day prior.

== Track listings ==
CD single
No.	Title	Length
1.	"Qué Hiciste"	4:58
2.	"Qué Hiciste" (Radio edit)	4:31
Total length:		9:29

Digital EP
No.	Title	Length
1.	"Qué Hiciste"	4:58
2.	"Qué Hiciste" (Salsa Remix)	4:50
3.	"Qué Hiciste" (Cass&Dubs Remix)	4:10
4.	"Qué Hiciste" (Tony Moran Radio Mix)	4:30
Total length:		18:28

== Credits and personnel ==
Credits are adapted from the liner notes of Como Ama una Mujer.

Technical

- "Que Hiciste" was recorded at Record Plant in Los Angeles, California.

Personnel

- Lead vocals - Jennifer Lopez
- Lyrics – Julio Reyes, Jimena Romero
- Music – Marc Anthony
- Production – Marc Anthony, Julio Reyes
- Recording engineer – Anthony Kilhoffer
- Mixing engineers – Andrés Bermudes, Julio Reyes
- Art direction – Julian Peploe
- Photography – Tony Duran

== Charts ==
=== Weekly charts ===
Chart (2007)	Peak position
Austria (Ö3 Austria Top 40)	19
Belgium (Ultratop 50 Flanders)	13
Belgium (Ultratop 50 Wallonia)	11
CIS Airplay (TopHit)	7
Croatia International (HRT)	1
Europe (Eurochart Hot 100)	20
Germany (GfK)	10
Global Dance Tracks (Billboard)	25
Hungary (Rádiós Top 40)	7
Italy (FIMI)	1
Netherlands (Dutch Top 40 Tipparade)	10
Portugal Digital Songs (Billboard)	7
Romania (Romanian Top 100)	3
Russia Airplay (TopHit)	9
Spain (Promusicae)	1
Switzerland (Schweizer Hitparade)	1
US Billboard Hot 100	86
US Dance Club Songs (Billboard)	1
US Hot Latin Songs (Billboard)	1

=== Year-end charts ===
Chart (2007)	Position
Belgium (Ultratop 50 Flanders)	74
Belgium (Ultratop 50 Wallonia)	45
CIS (TopHit)	40
Greece (IFPI)	36
Germany (Media Control GfK)	81
Italy (FIMI)	8
Romania (Romanian Top 100)	30
Russia Airplay (TopHit)	55
Spain (PROMUSICAE)	3
Switzerland (Schweizer Hitparade)	13
US Latin Pop Songs (Billboard)	26

== Certifications ==
Region	Certification	Certified units/sales
Italy Physical Sales	—	10,000
Italy Digital Download	—	60,000
Spain (Promusicae)	8× Platinum	160,000^{*}
Spain (Promusicae) Ringtone	14× Platinum	280,000^{*}
^{*} Sales figures based on certification alone.

== Release history ==
Region	Release date	Format	Label
Canada	January 26, 2007	Digital download	Epic
France	January 26, 2007	Digital download	Epic
United Kingdom	March 2, 2007	Digital download	Epic
United Kingdom	March 13, 2007	CD single	Epic
Germany	March 23, 2007	CD single	Epic
Germany	May 4, 2007	Digital EP	Epic
Canada	May 28, 2007	CD single	Epic

== See also ==
- List of number-one Billboard Hot Latin Songs of 2007
- List of number-one dance singles of 2007 (U.S.)
- List of number-one hits of 2007 (Italy)
- List of number-one hits of 2007 (Switzerland)
