= The Librarian =

The Librarian or The Librarians may refer to:

== Film ==
- The Librarian (1912 film), a silent short film produced by the Edison Company
- The Librarians (2003 film), American action thriller also released as Strike Force
- The Librarians (2025 film), American documentary film examining book bans

== Television ==
- The Librarian (franchise), a fantasy-adventure franchise starring Noah Wyle as Flynn Carsen
  - The Librarian: Quest for the Spear, a 2004 made-for-television film
  - The Librarian: Return to King Solomon's Mines, a 2006 made-for-television film
  - The Librarian: Curse of the Judas Chalice, a 2008 made-for-television film
  - The Librarians (2014 TV series), a spin-off television series
  - The Librarians: The Next Chapter, a 2025 spin-off television series
- The Librarians (2007 TV series), Australian comedy series
- "Librarian" (Not Going Out), a 2007 episode of the television sitcom
- The Librarian (TV series), a 2023 Russian television series based on the Elizarov novel

== Literature ==
- The Librarian (Discworld), a character from the Terry Pratchett novels
- The Librarian, a 2007 novel by Mikhail Elizarov, first translated to English in 2015
- The Librarian, a 2018 novel by Salley Vickers

== Other ==
- The Librarian (Arcimboldo), 1566 painting by Italian artist Giuseppe Arcimboldo
- The Librarian (version control system), a source code management software product made by Applied Data Research

== See also ==
- Librarian
