= Saturn Award for Best Television Presentation =

Annual US television award

Best Television Presentation or Limited Series
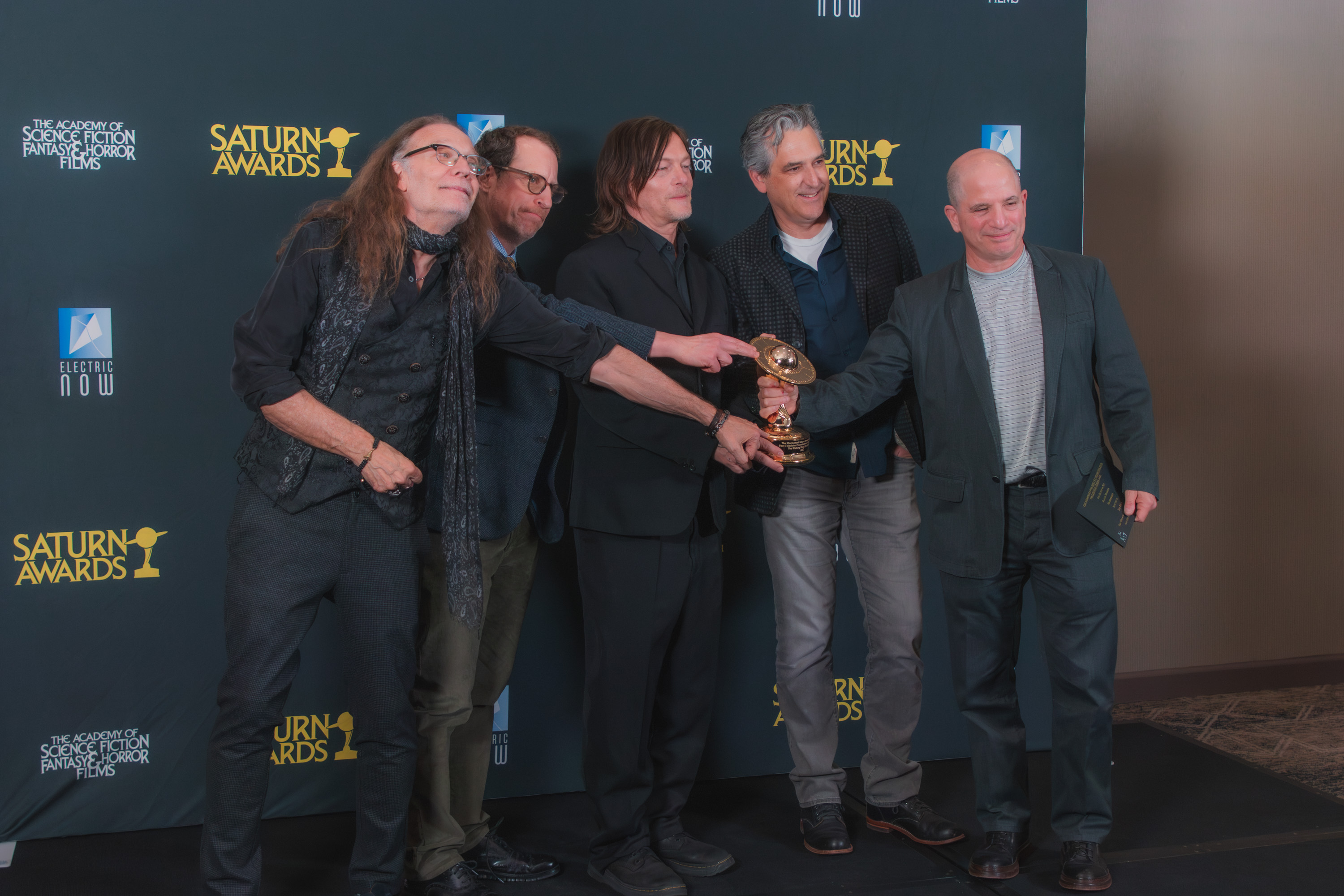
- The 2024/2025 recipients for The Walking Dead: Daryl Dixon
- Awarded for: Best television series of the year in the television presentation or limited series genres
- Country: United States
- Presented by: Academy of Science Fiction, Fantasy and Horror Films
- First award: 1994
- Currently held by: The Walking Dead: Daryl Dixon (2024/2025)
- Website: www.saturnawards.org

The following are a list of Saturn Award nominees and winners for Best Television Presentation. The award was introduced in 1994.

Breaking Bad, The Walking Dead and Doctor Who are the only series to have won the award twice; additionally, Breaking Bad and The Walking Dead have both won the award for Best Syndicated/Cable Television Series several times. Doctor Who (2005) is the most nominated series in the category, with five nominations.

As of the 50th Anniversary Saturn Awards, the category is known as Best Streaming Limited Event Television Series.

== Winners and nominees ==
=== 1990s ===
Year	Television Program	Network
1994 (21st)	Alien Nation: Dark Horizon	Fox
1994 (21st)	Fatherland	HBO
1994 (21st)	Hercules and the Circle of Fire	Syndicated
1994 (21st)	Roswell	Showtime
1994 (21st)	The Stand	ABC
1994 (21st)	TekWar	USA Network
1994 (21st)	Witch Hunt	HBO
1995 (22nd)	Alien Nation: Millennium	Fox
1995 (22nd)	Alien Autopsy: (Fact or Fiction?)	Fox
1995 (22nd)	Attack of the Killer B-Movies	NBC
1995 (22nd)	Goosebumps: The Haunted Mask	Fox
1995 (22nd)	The Invaders	Fox
1995 (22nd)	The Langoliers	ABC
1996 (23rd)	Doctor Who	Fox
1996 (23rd)	Alien Nation: The Enemy Within	Fox
1996 (23rd)	The Beast	NBC
1996 (23rd)	The Canterville Ghost	ABC
1996 (23rd)	Gulliver's Travels	NBC
1996 (23rd)	The Lottery	NBC
1996 (23rd)	Power Rangers Zeo	Fox
1997 (24th)	The Shining	ABC
1997 (24th)	Cinderella	ABC
1997 (24th)	House of Frankenstein	NBC
1997 (24th)	Invasion	NBC
1997 (24th)	Retroactive	Showtime
1997 (24th)	Snow White: A Tale of Terror	Showtime
1998 (25th)	Not awarded	
1999 (26th)	Storm of the Century	ABC
1999 (26th)	Animal Farm	TNT
1999 (26th)	A Christmas Carol	TNT
1999 (26th)	Journey to the Center of the Earth	USA Network
1999 (26th)	The Magical Legend of the Leprechauns	NBC
1999 (26th)	Thrill Seekers (The Time Shifters)	TBS

=== 2000s ===
Year	Television Program	Network
2000 (27th)	Fail Safe	CBS
2000 (27th)	Frank Herbert's Dune	Sci-Fi
2000 (27th)	Jason and the Argonauts	NBC
2000 (27th)	Santa Who?	ABC
2000 (27th)	Sole Survivor	Fox
2000 (27th)	Witchblade	TNT
2001 (28th)	Jack and the Beanstalk: The Real Story	CBS
2001 (28th)	Earth vs. the Spider	Cinemax
2001 (28th)	The Mists of Avalon	TNT
2001 (28th)	The Monkey King (The Lost Empire)	NBC
2001 (28th)	She Creature	Cinemax
2001 (28th)	Teenage Caveman	Cinemax
2002 (29th)	Taken	Sci-Fi
2002 (29th)	Carrie	NBC
2002 (29th)	Dinotopia	ABC
2002 (29th)	Lathe of Heaven	A&E
2002 (29th)	Rose Red	ABC
2002 (29th)	Snow Queen	Hallmark Channel
2003 (30th)	Battlestar Galactica	Sci-Fi
2003 (30th)	Children of Dune	Sci-Fi
2003 (30th)	The Diary of Ellen Rimbauer	ABC
2003 (30th)	Dreamkeeper	ABC
2003 (30th)	Riverworld	Sci-Fi
2003 (30th)	Star Wars: Clone Wars	Cartoon Network
2004 (31st)	Farscape: The Peacekeeper Wars	Sci-Fi
2004 (31st)	The Dead Will Tell	CBS
2004 (31st)	Earthsea	Sci-Fi
2004 (31st)	5ive Days to Midnight	Sci-Fi
2004 (31st)	The Librarian: Quest for the Spear	TNT
2004 (31st)	Salem's Lot	TNT
2005 (32nd)	Masters of Horror	Showtime
2005 (32nd)	The Triangle	Sci-Fi
2005 (32nd)	Category 7: The End of the World	CBS
2005 (32nd)	Into the West	TNT
2005 (32nd)	Mysterious Island	Hallmark Channel
2005 (32nd)	Revelations	NBC
2006 (33rd)	The Librarian: Return to King Solomon's Mines	TNT
2006 (33rd)	Life on Mars	BBC One
2006 (33rd)	The Lost Room	Sci-Fi
2006 (33rd)	Masters of Horror	Showtime
2006 (33rd)	Nightmares & Dreamscapes: From the Stories of Stephen King	TNT
2006 (33rd)	10.5: Apocalypse	NBC
2007 (34th)	Family Guy: "Blue Harvest"	Fox
2007 (34th)	Battlestar Galactica: Razor	Sci-Fi
2007 (34th)	The Company	TNT
2007 (34th)	Fallen	ABC Family
2007 (34th)	Masters of Science Fiction	ABC
2007 (34th)	Shrek the Halls	ABC
2007 (34th)	Tin Man	Sci-Fi
2008 (35th)	The Librarian: Curse of the Judas Chalice	TNT
2008 (35th)	The Andromeda Strain	A&E
2008 (35th)	Breaking Bad	AMC
2008 (35th)	Jericho	CBS
2008 (35th)	The Last Templar	NBC
2008 (35th)	24: Redemption	Fox
2009 (36th)	Torchwood: Children of Earth	BBC America
2009 (36th)	Alice	Syfy
2009 (36th)	Doctor Who: "The End of Time"	BBC America
2009 (36th)	The Prisoner	AMC
2009 (36th)	The Tudors	Showtime
2009 (36th)	V	ABC

=== 2010s ===
Year	Television Program	Network
2010 (37th)	The Walking Dead	AMC
2010 (37th)	Doctor Who: "A Christmas Carol"	BBC America
2010 (37th)	Kung Fu Panda Holiday	NBC
2010 (37th)	The Pillars of the Earth	Starz
2010 (37th)	Sherlock	PBS
2010 (37th)	Spartacus: Gods of the Arena	Starz
2011 (38th)	The Walking Dead	AMC
2011 (38th)	Camelot	Starz
2011 (38th)	Falling Skies	TNT
2011 (38th)	Game of Thrones	HBO
2011 (38th)	The Killing	AMC
2011 (38th)	Torchwood: Miracle Day	Starz
2011 (38th)	Trek Nation	Science Channel
2012 (39th)	Breaking Bad	AMC
2012 (39th)	Continuum	Syfy
2012 (39th)	Falling Skies	TNT
2012 (39th)	Game of Thrones	HBO
2012 (39th)	Mockingbird Lane	NBC
2012 (39th)	Spartacus: War of the Damned	Starz
2012 (39th)	World Without End	Reelz
2013 (40th)	Breaking Bad	AMC
2013 (40th)	Bates Motel	A&E
2013 (40th)	Black Sails	Starz
2013 (40th)	Falling Skies	TNT
2013 (40th)	Game of Thrones	HBO
2013 (40th)	Vikings	History
2014 (41st)	Game of Thrones	HBO
2014 (41st)	Bates Motel	A&E
2014 (41st)	From Dusk till Dawn: The Series	El Rey Network
2014 (41st)	The Last Ship	TNT
2014 (41st)	The Librarians	TNT
2014 (41st)	Outlander	Starz
2015 (42nd)	Doctor Who: "The Husbands of River Song"	BBC America
2015 (42nd)	The Cannibal in the Jungle	Animal Planet
2015 (42nd)	Childhood's End	Syfy
2015 (42nd)	Sharknado 3: Oh Hell No!	Syfy
2015 (42nd)	Turkey Hollow	Lifetime
2015 (42nd)	The Wiz Live!	NBC
2016 (43rd)	11.22.63	Hulu
2016 (43rd)	Channel Zero	Syfy
2016 (43rd)	Doctor Who: "The Return of Doctor Mysterio"	BBC America
2016 (43rd)	Mars	National Geographic
2016 (43rd)	The Night Manager	AMC
2016 (43rd)	Rats	Discovery Channel
2017 (44th)	Twin Peaks: The Return	Showtime
2017 (44th)	Channel Zero	Syfy
2017 (44th)	Descendants 2	Disney Channel
2017 (44th)	Doctor Who: "Twice Upon a Time"	BBC America
2017 (44th)	Mystery Science Theater 3000: The Return	Netflix
2017 (44th)	Okja	Netflix
2017 (44th)	The Sinner	USA Network
2018/2019 (45th)	Not awarded	
Under 10 Episodes
2019/2020 (46th)	The Mandalorian	Disney+
2019/2020 (46th)	Amazing Stories	Apple TV+
2019/2020 (46th)	Dracula	Netflix
2019/2020 (46th)	The Haunting of Bly Manor	Netflix
2019/2020 (46th)	His Dark Materials	HBO
2019/2020 (46th)	Perry Mason	HBO

=== 2020s ===
Year	Television Program	Network
2021/2022 (50th)	Obi-Wan Kenobi	Disney+
2021/2022 (50th)	The Book of Boba Fett	Disney+
2021/2022 (50th)	Hawkeye	Disney+
2021/2022 (50th)	Midnight Mass	Netflix
2021/2022 (50th)	Moon Knight	Disney+
2021/2022 (50th)	Ms. Marvel	Disney+
2022/2023 (51st)	Werewolf by Night	Disney+
2022/2023 (51st)	Black Mirror	Netflix
2022/2023 (51st)	Guillermo del Toro's Cabinet of Curiosities	Netflix
2022/2023 (51st)	Hocus Pocus 2	Disney+
2022/2023 (51st)	The Midnight Club	Netflix
2022/2023 (51st)	Mrs. Davis	Peacock
2022/2023 (51st)	The Munsters	Netflix
2023/2024 (52nd)	The Walking Dead: The Ones Who Live	AMC
2023/2024 (52nd)	Apartment 7A	Paramount+
2023/2024 (52nd)	Don't Move	Netflix
2023/2024 (52nd)	The Fall of the House of Usher	Netflix
2023/2024 (52nd)	Fargo	FX
2023/2024 (52nd)	Ripley	Netflix
2023/2024 (52nd)	'Salem's Lot	Max
2024/2025 (53rd)	The Walking Dead: Daryl Dixon	AMC
2024/2025 (53rd)	The Beast in Me	Netflix
2024/2025 (53rd)	Black Mirror	Netflix
2024/2025 (53rd)	Murderbot	Apple TV+
2024/2025 (53rd)	Nautilus	Amazon Prime Video
2024/2025 (53rd)	The Pitt	HBO Max
