= Electric Entertainment =

American film production company

Electric Entertainment, Inc.
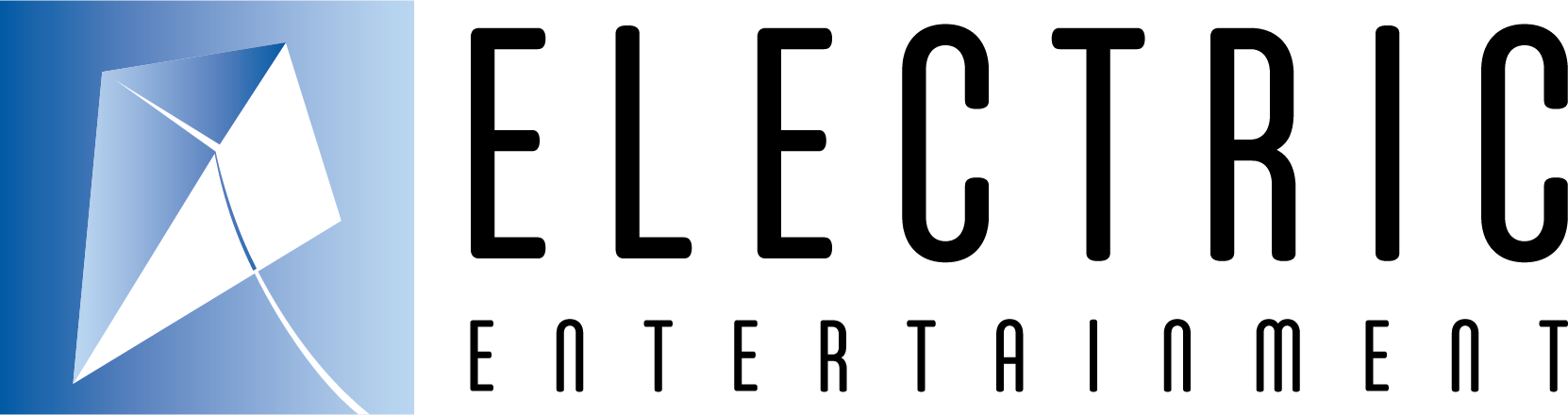
- Company type: Private
- Industry: Motion pictures; Television films
- Founded: January 11, 2001; 25 years ago
- Founder: Dean Devlin
- Headquarters: 962 N. La Cienega Blvd. Los Angeles, CA 90069
- Website: electricentertainment.com

Electric Entertainment, Inc. is an American independent television and media production company, established in 2001 by veteran writer/producer Dean Devlin and led by Devlin along with partners Marc Roskin and Rachel Olschan.

== History ==
Electric Entertainment was established when many workers of Centropolis Entertainment, including Dean Devlin left to form its organization in 2001. This included its development slate, that were originally controlled by Centropolis, including the film Eight Legged Freaks, which is the first film to be produced by the company.

Later that year, the studio struck a deal with Paramount Pictures in order to gain Electric access to Paramount's development slate.

Five years later, the studio struck a deal with Metro-Goldwyn-Mayer to distribute its content for feature films.

In 2019, the studio launched its own streaming service, ElectricNOW, to provide its content for the OTT streaming range and it will run for all digital platforms.

== Electric Visual Effects (EFX) ==
EFX is the in-house division of Electric Entertainment and headed by Mark Franco. The company consists of film industry veterans who had previously collaborated on projects produced by Dean Devlin.

== Filmography ==
=== Films ===
| Release date | Title | Director | Distributor | Studio | Notes |
|---|---|---|---|---|---|
| July 17, 2002 | Eight Legged Freaks | Ellory Elkayem | Warner Bros. Pictures | Village Roadshow Pictures | First film produced by the company |
| September 10, 2004 | Cellular | David R. Ellis | New Line Cinema | | |
| December 5, 2004 | The Librarian: Quest for the Spear | Peter Winther | TNT | ApolloProScreen | TV movie |
| June 28, 2006 | Who Killed the Electric Car? | Chris Paine | Sony Pictures Classics | Plinyminor Productions; Papercut Films | Documentary |
| September 22, 2006 | Flyboys | Tony Bill | MGM Distribution Co. | Ingenious Film Partners; Skydance Productions; Metro-Goldwyn-Mayer | |
| December 3, 2006 | The Librarian: Return to King Solomon's Mines | Jonathan Frakes | TNT | Blue Sky Films | TV movie |
| December 7, 2008 | The Librarian: Curse of the Judas Chalice | Jonathan Frakes | TNT | Self-produced | TV movie |
| December 4, 2015 | The Wannabe | Nick Sandow | Orion Pictures; Momentum Pictures | Traction Media | |
| June 24, 2016 | Independence Day: Resurgence | Roland Emmerich | 20th Century Fox | Centropolis Entertainment | |
| January 13, 2017 | The Book of Love | Bill Purple | Self-distributed | C Plus Pictures; Campfire; Iron Ocean Films; Nine Nights | distributor |
| October 20, 2017 | Geostorm | Dean Devlin | Warner Bros. Pictures | Skydance Media; RatPac-Dune Entertainment | |
| November 3, 2017 | LBJ | Rob Reiner | Self-distributed | Acaia Entertainment; Savvy Media Holdings; Star Thrower Entertainment; Castle Rock Entertainment; ITS Capital; Parkside Pictures; Tadross Media Group | distributor |
| May 4, 2018 | Bad Samaritan | Dean Devlin | Self-distributed | Legion M | distributor |
| June 14, 2019 | Say My Name | Jay Stern | Self-distributed | | distributor |
| October 13, 2019 | As I Am | Guy Davies | Self-distributed | Fablemaze; Zebrafish Media | U.S. distributor |
| February 9, 2021 | Heavy | Jouri Smit | Self-distributed | FullDawa Films; JoBro Productions & Film Finance; Lost Lane Entertainment; NJNL Company; PaperChase Films | U.S. VOD distributor |
| March 9, 2021 | Blood on the Crown | Davide Ferrario | Self-distributed | Juggernaut; Arts Council Malta; Monolith Productions; Malta Film Commission; Trilight Entertainment; Anamorphic Media | distributor |
| February 9, 2021 | The Fight That Never Ends | Preston A. Whitmore II | Lifetime | Brandani Productions; Preston Picture Company; Sunset Pictures | TV movie |
| October 7, 2022 | Ask Me to Dance | Tom Malloy | Self-distributed | XYZ Films; Trick Candle Productions | U.S. distributor |
| June 25, 2023 | Exile | Jason James | Self-distributed | Service Street Pictures; Goodbye Productions; Resonance Film & Video | U.S. distributor |
| May 14, 2024 (digital) | Adam the First | Irving Franco | Nova Vento Entertainment (theaters) | Randomix Productions; Crystal City Entertainment; Adam 1 Pictures | U.S. distributor (digital) |
| March 2026 (digital) | The Bunker | Brian Hanson | Self-distributed | Paper Street Pictures | U.S. distributor (digital) |

=== Television ===
| Year | Title | Creators | Network | Co-production companies |
|---|---|---|---|---|
| 2005 | The Triangle | Rockne S. O'Bannon; Bryan Singer; Dean Devlin | Sci-Fi Channel | |
| 2008–2012 | Leverage | John Rodgers; Chris Downey | TNT | Johnworld, Inc. |
| 2014–2018 | The Librarians | Based on The Librarian by: David Titcher; Developed by: John Rodgers | TNT | Kung Fu Monkey Productions (seasons 1-2) |
| 2018–2021 | The Outpost | Jason Faller; Kynan Griffin | The CW | Arrowstorm Entertainment |
| 2020 | Almost Paradise | Dean Devlin; Gary Rosen | WGN America | ABS-CBN Entertainment |
| 2021 | Almost Paradise | Dean Devlin; Gary Rosen | Kapamilya Channel | ABS-CBN Entertainment |
| 2021–2025 | Leverage: Redemption | John Rodgers; Chris Downey | IMDb TV | Johnworld, Inc. |
| 2023–present | The Ark | Dean Devlin and Jonathan Glassner | Syfy | Balkanic Media; PFI Studios |
| 2025–present | The Librarians: The Next Chapter | Based on The Librarian by: David Titcher; Developed by: Dean Devlin | TNT | Balkanic Media |
