= Dean Devlin =

American filmmaker

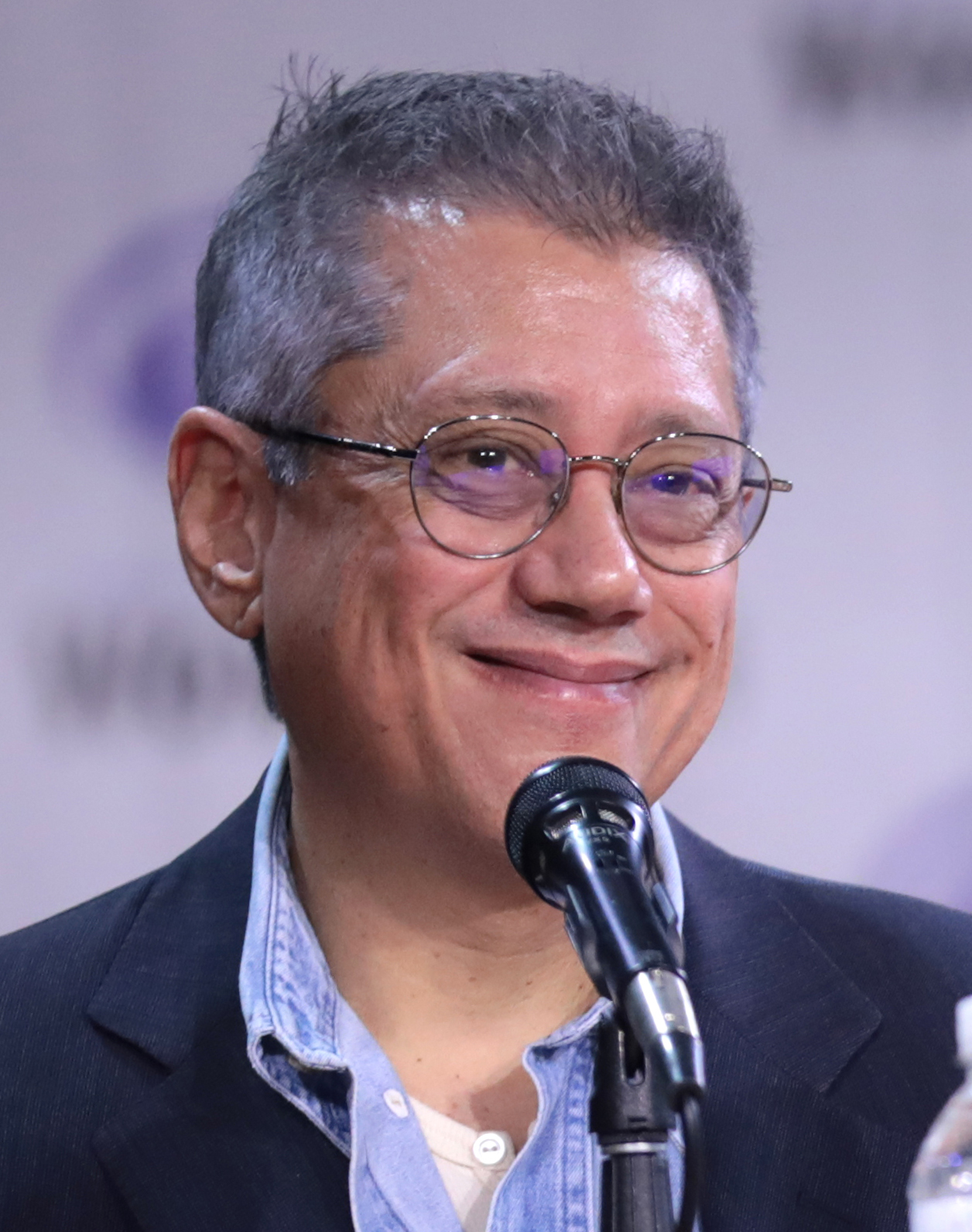
- Devlin at the 2023 WonderCon
- Occupations: Screenwriter; producer; director; actor
- Years active: 1980–present
- Children: 1

Dean Devlin is an American screenwriter, producer, director, and film and television actor. He is best known for his collaborations with director Roland Emmerich, and for his work on the Librarian and Leverage television franchises. He is a co-founder of the production companies Centropolis Entertainment and Electric Entertainment. He was a series regular of the short lived TV series Hard Copy.

== Early life ==
Devlin's father, Don Devlin (1930–2000), an actor turned writer-producer who was noted for discovering Steven Spielberg, was Jewish, and his mother, Pilar Seurat, was a Filipino actress.

== Career ==
=== Film ===
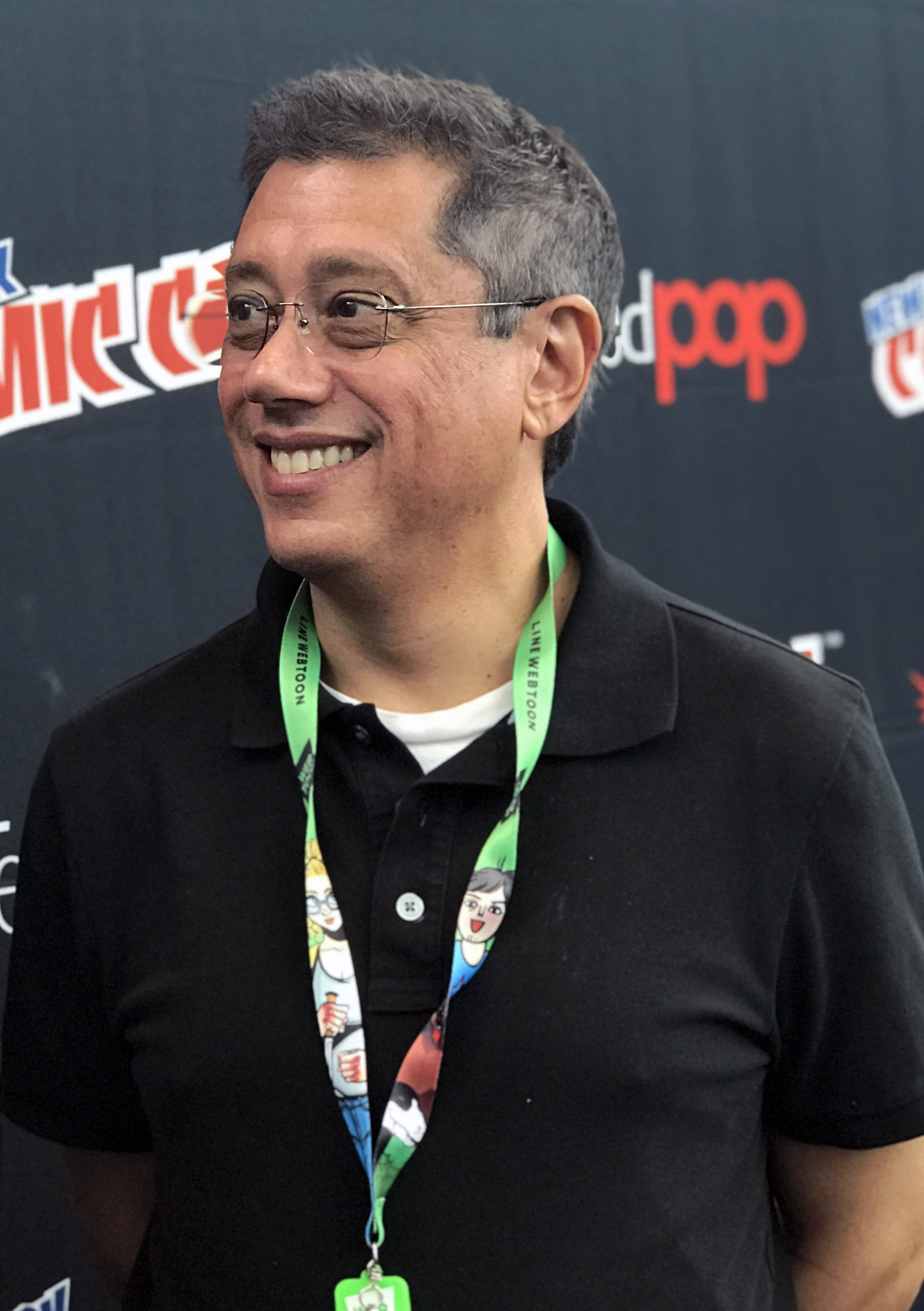
Devlin at the 2017 New York Comic Con

Devlin appeared as an actor on numerous television shows throughout the 1980s. He also appeared in films, including My Bodyguard, The Wild Life, Real Genius, and Martians Go Home. Due to his youthful appearance, Devlin often played teenage characters despite being in his 20s.

Devlin gradually began writing scripts. His first produced screenplay was for Universal Soldier. He reached prominence as a writer/producer working alongside director Roland Emmerich, with whom he teamed after appearing in Emmerich's film Moon 44. Together they cowrote and produced Stargate, the first movie to have a web site. The team then produced Independence Day and Godzilla. They split following the 2000 Mel Gibson film The Patriot, but re-teamed to film Independence Day: Resurgence in 2016. Devlin also produced Cellular, Who Killed the Electric Car?, and Flyboys.

Devlin's directorial debut was the action sci-fi film Geostorm for Warner Bros. The film was set for a March 2016 release, later rescheduled for October 2017. It starred Gerard Butler as the lead with Jim Sturgess, Abbie Cornish, Ed Harris and Andy Garcia. The film made $221 million on a $120 million budget. In March 2018, Deadline Hollywood calculated the film lost Warner Bros. $71.6 million when factoring in all other expenses and revenues.

Devlin's second film as director was the 2018 thriller Bad Samaritan, starring Robert Sheehan and David Tennant.

=== Television ===
Devlin produced The Triangle miniseries, Leverage (of which he has directed twelve episodes), The Librarian franchise, and The Outpost. He also co-created The Visitor series.

In 2019, Devlin began working with the Philippine media conglomerate ABS-CBN to produce a new series called Almost Paradise (originally titled Off Tropic). The series premiered in the United States on May 30, 2020, on WGN America, and premiered on Kapamilya Channel in 2021. It was filmed entirely in the Philippines, and the majority of the cast members are Filipino, aside from the lead—played by Christian Kane, with whom Devlin had worked on the television shows Leverage and The Librarians.

Devlin produced The Ark TV series for Syfy, which aired starting in February 2023.

=== Video games ===
Devlin was an advisor to the video game company ZeniMax Media from 1999 to 2004. Additionally, Devlin was involved in video game projects The 10th Planet and Godzilla Online.

== Personal life ==
Devlin is married to actress Lisa Brenner. Their daughter, Hannah Devlin, is also an actress who guest-starred in Devlin's TV series The Librarians: The Next Chapter.

== Filmography ==
Year	Title	Director	Producer	Writer	Notes
1992	Universal Soldier	No	No	Yes	Co-writer with Richard Rothstein & Christopher Leitch
1994	Stargate	No	Yes	Yes	Co-writer with Roland Emmerich
1996	Independence Day	No	Yes	Yes	Co-writer with Roland Emmerich
1998	Godzilla	No	Yes	Yes	Co-writer with Roland Emmerich, co-wrote story with Emmerich, Terry Rossio & Ted Elliott
2000	The Patriot	No	Yes	No	
2002	Eight Legged Freaks	No	Yes	No	
2004	Cellular	No	Yes	No	
2006	Who Killed the Electric Car?	No	Executive	No	Documentary
2006	Flyboys	No	Yes	No	
2011	Shakespeare High	No	Executive	No	Documentary
2013	Transit	No	Executive	No	
2015	The Wannabe	No	Executive	No	
2016	Independence Day: Resurgence	No	Yes	Yes	Co-writer with Roland Emmerich, Nicolas Wright, James A. Woods & James Vanderbilt
2017	Geostorm	Yes	Yes	Yes	Directorial debut Co-writer with Paul Guyot
2018	Bad Samaritan	Yes	Yes	No	
2025	One Big Happy Family	No	Yes	No	

=== Television ===
The numbers in directing and writing credits refer to the number of episodes.

Year	Title	Functioned as				Network	Notes
Year	Title	Creator	Director	Writer	Executive producer	Network	Notes
1997–98	The Visitor	Yes	No	Yes (3)	Yes	Fox	
1998–2000	Godzilla: The Series	No	No	No	Yes	Fox Kids	
2004	The Librarian: Quest for the Spear	No	No	No	Yes	TNT	Television film
2005	The Triangle	No	No	Story	Yes	Sci-Fi Channel	Miniseries
2006	Talk to Me	No	No	No	Yes	TNT	Unaired pilot
2006	The Librarian: Return to King Solomon's Mines	No	No	No	Yes	TNT	Television film
2008	Blank Slate	No	No	No	Yes	TNT	Television film
2008	The Librarian: Curse of the Judas Chalice	No	No	No	Yes	TNT	Television film
2008–12	Leverage	No	Yes (16)	No	Yes	TNT	
2011	Brain Trust	Yes	Yes	No	Yes	TBS	Unaired pilot
2014–18	The Librarians	No	Yes (6)	Yes (1)	Yes	TNT	
2018–21	The Outpost	No	No	No	Yes	The CW	
2020	Almost Paradise	No	Yes (1)	Yes (2)	Yes	WGN America season 1, Amazon Freevee season 2	
2021–25	Leverage: Redemption	No	Yes (4)	Yes (1)	Yes	Amazon Freevee, Amazon Prime	
2023–present	The Ark	Yes	Yes (1)	Yes (1)	Yes	Syfy	
2025–present	The Librarians: The Next Chapter	No	Yes (2)	Yes (3)	Yes	TNT	Showrunner

=== Acting roles ===
Year	Title	Role
1984	The Wild Life	Liquor Store Clerk
1984	City Limits	Ernie
1985	Real Genius	Milton
1987	Hard Copy	David Del Valle
1989	Martians Go Home	Joe Fledermaus
1990	Moon 44	Tyler
1991	Total Exposure	Adult Bookstore Manager

== Awards and nominations ==
Academy of Science Fiction, Fantasy and Horror Films
Year	Nominated work	Category	Result
1996	Independence Day	Best Writer	Nominated
1998	—N/a	George Pal Memorial Award	Won
Golden Raspberry Awards
1996	Independence Day	Worst Written Film Grossing Over $100 Million	Nominated
1998	Godzilla	Worst Picture	Nominated
1998	Godzilla	Worst Screenplay	Nominated
2016	Independence Day: Resurgence	Worst Screenplay	Nominated
Hugo Awards
1994	Stargate	Best Dramatic Presentation	Nominated
1996	Independence Day	Best Dramatic Presentation	Nominated
Online Film & Television Association
1996	Independence Day	Best Sci-Fi/Fantasy/Horror Picture	Nominated
Sci-Fi Universe Magazine
1996	Independence Day	Best Writing for a Genre Motion Picture	Won
Stinkers Bad Movie Awards
1998	Godzilla	Worst Screenplay for a Film Grossing More than $100 Million Using Hollywood Math	Won
