= The Librarian (franchise) =

American fantasy-adventure media franchise

- Created by: David Titcher
- Original work: The Librarian: Quest for the Spear
- Owner: Electric Entertainment

Print publications
- Book: The Adventures of the Librarian: Quest for the Spear
- Novels: The Librarians and the Lost Lamp; The Librarians and the Mother Goose Chase; The Librarians and the Pot of Gold
- Comics: The Librarian; The Librarians

Films and television
- Television series: The Librarians; The Librarians: The Next Chapter
- Television films: The Librarian: Quest for the Spear; The Librarian: Return to King Solomon's Mines; The Librarian: Curse of the Judas Chalice

Audio
- Soundtracks: The Librarian: Return To King Solomon's Mine & Quest For The Spear; The Librarian: Curse Of The Judas Chalice; The Librarians

The Librarian is a franchise that includes a series of original fantasy-adventure made-for-television films from TNT starring Noah Wyle as Flynn Carsen, a perpetual university student hired to protect a secret collection of magical artifacts in an alternate dimension known simply as the Library. Two television series have also been produced, following the films.

== Development ==
Dean Devlin, through his production company Electric Entertainment, brought David Titcher's original pitch to TNT. David Titcher wrote and created the original movie that sequels were based on. The director of the first film was Peter Winther, and writer/creator David Titcher co-produced with Marc Roskin and Kearie Peak. In 2004, they planned to produce three Librarian films with ER star Noah Wyle.

"Dean's pitch was a refreshing take on the hero story", TNT's Senior Vice President of Original Programming Michael Wright said. "Instead of a muscle-bound, spandex-clad superman, we get an insecure but brilliant guy who thinks he's taking a safe job as a librarian, but instead gets taken on a ride in a world we'd like to believe exists."

== Television films ==
| Film | Released | Director | Teleplay by | Producers | Network |
|---|---|---|---|---|---|
| The Librarian: Quest for the Spear | December 5, 2004 | Peter Winther | David Titcher | Jörg Westerkamp, Kai Schürmann and Phillip M. Goldfarb | TNT |
| The Librarian: Return to King Solomon's Mines | December 3, 2006 | Jonathan Frakes | Marco Schnabel | Noah Wyle and Michael S. Murphey | TNT |
| The Librarian: Curse of the Judas Chalice | December 7, 2008 | Jonathan Frakes | Marco Schnabel | Noah Wyle and John Rogers | TNT |

=== The Librarian: Quest for the Spear (2004) ===
Quest for the Spear introduces Flynn Carsen (Noah Wyle), who is hired by the Metropolitan Public Library for the job of "Librarian". What Flynn does not realize is that the actual Library where he is to work is an alternate dimension existing below the Public Library, which has existed for centuries and protects a range of historical and often magical items, including The Ark of the Covenant, Pandora's box, and Excalibur. When part of the Spear of Destiny is stolen from the library, Flynn must recover it with the help of Nicole Noone.

=== The Librarian: Return to King Solomon's Mines (2006) ===
Return to King Solomon's Mines begins with Flynn's attending a party at his mother's house, where he meets up with his "Uncle" Jerry, a close friend of his late father. Soon Flynn is on a quest to locate King Solomon's Mines, and along the way he teams up with Emily Davenport, an archaeologist who helps Flynn translate the Akon (aklo algolis) language. When they meet up with Jerry in Kenya, all is not what it seems.

=== The Librarian: Curse of the Judas Chalice (2008) ===
Curse of the Judas Chalice finds Flynn experiencing a strange dream which leads him to New Orleans, where he finds himself in the way of a Russian conspiracy that involves the notorious Wallachian prince-turned-vampire Vlad Dracula. Once again, Flynn must overcome his fears and protect one of the world's most powerful and dangerous artifacts, the Judas Chalice, or face the consequences of it falling into the wrong hands.

== Television series ==
Two television series make up The Librarians franchise: The Librarians, and The Next Chapter. All series in total amount to 66 episodes across six seasons of television.

| Series | Season | Episodes | Originally released | | | Showrunner | Status |
| Series | Season | Episodes | First released | Last released | Network | Showrunner | Status |
|---|---|---|---|---|---|---|---|
| The Librarians | 1 | 10 | December 7, 2014 | January 18, 2015 | TNT | Dean Devlin | Concluded |
| The Librarians | 2 | 10 | November 1, 2015 | December 27, 2015 | TNT | Dean Devlin | Concluded |
| The Librarians | 3 | 10 | November 20, 2016 | January 22, 2017 | TNT | Dean Devlin | Concluded |
| The Librarians | 4 | 12 | December 13, 2017 | February 7, 2018 | TNT | Dean Devlin | Concluded |
| The Librarians: The Next Chapter | 1 | 12 | May 25, 2025 | August 4, 2025 | TNT | Dean Devlin | Released |
| The Librarians: The Next Chapter | 2 | 12 | August 2, 2026 | September 7, 2026 | TNT | Dean Devlin | Released |

=== The Librarians (2014–2018) ===
TNT ordered a ten-episode weekly series version of The Librarian, following the original cast that includes Noah Wyle, Bob Newhart and Jane Curtin, as well as four new characters who work for the Library in a division known as an Annex. A teaser trailer aired right after the Falling Skies season finale. The series premiered on December 7, 2014.

The Annex team consists of: Colonel Eve Baird (Rebecca Romijn), who is a counter-terrorism agent chosen as the group's Guardian; Jacob Stone (Christian Kane), an oil rigger with an IQ of 190 and extensive knowledge of art history, architecture, archaeology, and other humanities; Cassandra Killian (Lindy Booth), who is skilled in mathematics and physics and has the special gift of auditory and sensory hallucinations linked to memory retrieval known as synesthesia; and Ezekiel Jones (John Kim), an international master thief and computer hacker. Jenkins (John Larroquette) serves as the elderly but immortal, reluctant and sometimes cantankerous caretaker of the Annex, who has extensive knowledge of ancient lore. He is revealed to be Sir Galahad of King Arthur's Camelot at the end of the first season. Over the course of each season, Eve's team battles a different evil individual or organization seeking to use the Library's powers or the artifacts it holds for their own gain. For instance, in the first season, they confront the Serpent Brotherhood, led by the mysterious figure Dulaque, who is determined to bring magic back into the world and is really the immortal Sir Lancelot du Lac, Jenkins' illegitimate father.

The series was filmed in Portland, Oregon. On February 12, 2015, it was announced that the series had been renewed for a second ten-episode season. It premiered on November 1, 2015. In December 2015, it was announced that the series would be renewed for a third season. On January 24, 2017, TNT renewed the series for a fourth season. In March 2018, the series was cancelled.

=== The Librarians: The Next Chapter (2025–present) ===
In May 2023, The CW ordered a spin-off series titled The Librarians: The Next Chapter, which was set to premiere in late 2024, airing on Thursdays right after Superman and Lois. On August 16, 2024, it was pulled from The CW lineup. On August 23, 2024, it was announced that TNT had picked up the series after being pulled from The CW schedule. The series premiered on May 25, 2025, and featured a new team working at another annex of the Library based in Belgrade, Serbia. The new team consists of Vikram Chamberlain (Callum McGowan), the active Librarian of 1847 who was transported to 2025 through a timeless prison; Dr. Lysa Pascal (Olivia Morris), an initially skeptical mathematician, scientist, and engineer who inherits the castle where the Belgrade annex is hosted; Connor Green (Bluey Robinson), a disgraced but brilliant former university professor-turned-popular Web video conspiracy theorist who discovers the Library while trying to prove that magic is real; and Charlie Cornwall (Jessica Green), a combat veteran and Guardian candidate given a second chance by Jacob Stone. The Belgrade annex's immortal caretaker is Elaine Astolat (Caroline Loncq), another former knight of Camelot whose role as a knight was erased from history by her vengeful ex-lover Lancelot.

== Books ==
=== The Adventures of the Librarian: Quest for the Spear (2004) ===
A novelization of the first movie was adapted by Christopher Tracy as The Adventures of the Librarian: Quest for the Spear, which was published in 2004.

=== The Librarians tie-in novels ===
Three tie-in novels have been published, all written by Greg Cox:

- The Librarians and the Lost Lamp (2016) follows the characters of the television series as they attempt to find Aladdin's lamp, in both the past and the future.
- In The Librarians and the Mother Goose Chase (2017) the characters attempt to find various sections of the original Mother Goose story book before a descendant of the original Mother Goose is able to recombine the parts and use its power.
- In The Librarians and the Pot of Gold (2019) the Serpent Brotherhood have returned, and the Librarians learn the truth behind the story of St. Patrick driving the “snakes” out of Éire. He had the help of a Librarian.

== Comic books ==
=== The Librarian: Return to King Solomon's Mines (2006) ===
Released in November 2006, Electric Entertainment and Atlantis Studios produced a graphic novel adaptation of Return to King Solomon's Mines. The adaption was written by James Watson and illustrated by Nate Pride.

Electric Entertainment and Atlantis Studios additionally signed an exclusive worldwide agreement to produce an original comic book series based on The Librarian characters. "Comics are great opportunities to explore mythology, history, and each character in a way we could never do on film," said Executive Producer Dean Devlin. "There are thousands of artifacts in the Library – each one a new adventure. Based on the response we’ve had from the first film, fans of all ages loved the characters and want to see more. This series will give it to them."

=== The Librarians: In Search Of... (2017) ===
On June 20, 2017, writer Will Pfeifer and artist Rodney Buchemi were announced as creators of a new comic book series from Dynamite Entertainment, based on The Librarians, set to launch on September 13. The final issue was released December 13, 2017.

== Proposed theatrical film ==
In 2009, producer Dean Devlin had indicated that the next entry in The Librarian series would be a theatrical release. Shooting was planned for some time in 2009. However, actor and producer Noah Wyle later said in an interview at the 2010 San Diego Comic-Con that shooting had not begun and there were no immediate plans for a theatrical release of the next film in the series. Since then, there has been no more news about the project.

== Characters ==
| Character | Television films | | | Television series | |
| Character | The Librarian: Quest for the Spear | The Librarian: Return to King Solomon's Mines | The Librarian: Curse of the Judas Chalice | The Librarians | The Librarians: The Next Chapter |
|---|---|---|---|---|---|
| Year of Release | 2004 | 2006 | 2008 | 2014–2018 | 2025–present |
| Flynn Carsen | Noah Wyle | Noah Wyle | Noah Wyle | Noah Wyle | |
| Charlene | Jane Curtin | Jane Curtin | Jane Curtin | Jane Curtin | |
| Judson | Bob Newhart | Bob Newhart | Bob Newhart | Bob Newhart | |
| Margie Carsen | Olympia Dukakis | Olympia Dukakis | | | |
| Debra Markham Porter | Lisa Brenner | Lisa Brenner | | | |
| Edward Wilde | Kyle MacLachlan | | | | |
| Nicole Noone | Sonya Walger | | Sonya Walger (archival footage) | Rachel Nichols | |
| Lana | Kelly Hu | | | | |
| "Uncle" Jerry | | Robert Foxworth | | | |
| Emily Davenport | | Gabrielle Anwar | | | |
| Jomo | | Hakeem Kae-Kazim | | | |
| Gen. Samir | | Erick Avari | | | |
| Professor Lazlo / Vlad Dracula | | | Bruce Davison | | |
| Simone Renoir | | | Stana Katic | | |
| Sergei Kubichek | | | Dikran Tulaine | | |
| Ivan | | | Jason Douglas | | |
| Katie | | | Beth Burvant | | |
| Eve Baird | | | | Rebecca Romijn | |
| Jacob Stone | | | | Christian Kane | Christian Kane |
| Cassandra Cillian | | | | Lindy Booth | Lindy Booth |
| Ezekiel Jones | | | | John Kim | |
| Jenkins/Galahad | | | | John Larroquette | |
| Dulaque/Lancelot du Lac | | | | Matt Frewer; Jerry O'Connell (young) | Philip Rosch |
| Lamia | | | | Lesley-Ann Brandt | |
| Moriarty | | | | David S. Lee | |
| Prospero | | | | Richard Cox | |
| Vikram Chamberlain | | | | | Callum McGowan |
| Charlie Cornwall | | | | | Jessica Green |
| Lysa Pascal | | | | | Olivia Morris |
| Connor Green | | | | | Bluey Robinson |
| Elaine Astolat | | | | | Caroline Loncq |

== Mythology of The Librarian ==
The Librarians are the guardians of powerful and magical relics, having been for centuries, and often undertake globe-spanning adventures to recover items and store them in the Library. Some of the relics in the Library include: the original Mona Lisa, Excalibur, the Ark of the Covenant, the Fountain of Youth, the Nautilus, Noah's Ark, Pan's flute, Pandora's box, Poseidon's trident, and the Shroud of Turin. There are also living assets within the Library; for example, the Loch Ness Monster can be seen in the water around the "tree" made of walkways at the end of the Judas Chalice adventure.

== Awards ==
=== The Librarian: Quest for the Spear ===
==== Nominated ====
- Saturn Award (2005): Best Actor on Television (Noah Wyle), Best Supporting Actor on Television (Kyle MacLachlan), Best Supporting Actress on Television (Sonya Walger), and Best Television Presentation
- Motion Picture Sound Editors (2005): Golden Reel Award for Best Sound Editing in Television Long Form – Sound Effects & Foley.
- Visual Effects Society Awards (2005): VES Award for Outstanding Compositing in a Broadcast Program
- Writers Guild of America (2006): WGA Award for Long Form – Original (David N. Titcher)

=== The Librarian: Return to King Solomon's Mines ===
==== Won ====
- Saturn Award (2007): Best Presentation on Television.

==== Nominated ====
- Saturn Award (2007): Best Actor on Television (Noah Wyle), and Best Supporting Actress on Television (Gabrielle Anwar).
- American Society of Cinematographers (2007): ASC Award for Outstanding Achievement in Cinematography in Movies of the Week/Mini-Series/Pilot (Walt Lloyd)
- Broadcast Film Critics Association Awards (2007): Critics Choice Award for Best Picture Made for Television
- Emmy Awards (2007): Outstanding Music Composition for a Miniseries, Movie or a Special (Joseph LoDuca), and Outstanding Sound Editing for a Miniseries, Movie or a Special

== See also ==
- Indiana Jones
- The Invisible Library series
- Tomb Raider
- Warehouse 13
- Relic Hunter
- Uncharted
