= 33rd Saturn Awards =

US film and television award ceremony

- Date: May 10, 2007
- Site: California, U.S.

Highlights
- Most awards: Superman Returns (5)
- Most nominations: Superman Returns (10)

The 33rd Saturn Awards, honoring the best in science fiction, fantasy and horror film and television in 2006, were held on 10 May 2007 at the Universal City Hilton Hotel in Los Angeles, California. They were hosted by Greg Grunberg and Jeffrey Ross. The ceremony also celebrated the 35th anniversary of the Academy of Science Fiction, Fantasy and Horror Films.

Below is a complete list of nominees and winners. Winners are highlighted in boldface.

== Winners and nominees ==
=== Film ===
Best Sci-Fi Film	Best Fantasy Film
**Children of Men**; Déjà Vu; The Fountain; The Prestige; V for Vendetta; X-Men: The Last Stand	**Superman Returns**; Charlotte's Web; Eragon; Night at the Museum; Pirates of the Caribbean: Dead Man's Chest; Stranger than Fiction
Best Horror Film	Best Action/Adventure/Thriller Film
**The Descent**; Final Destination 3; Hostel; Saw III; Slither; Snakes on a Plane	**Casino Royale**; The Departed; Flyboys; Mission: Impossible III; Notes on a Scandal; Perfume: The Story of a Murderer
Best Animated Film	Best International Film
**Cars**; Flushed Away; Happy Feet; Monster House; Over the Hedge; A Scanner Darkly	**Pan's Labyrinth**; Apocalypto; Curse of the Golden Flower; Fearless; The Host; Letters from Iwo Jima
Best Actor	Best Actress
**Brandon Routh – Superman Returns as Clark Kent / Superman**; Daniel Craig – Casino Royale as James Bond; Tom Cruise – Mission: Impossible III as Ethan Hunt; Will Ferrell – Stranger than Fiction as Harold Crick; Hugh Jackman – The Fountain as Tomás Verde / Tom Creo / Tommy the Space Traveler; Clive Owen – Children of Men as Theo Faron	**Natalie Portman – V for Vendetta as Evey Hammond**; Kate Bosworth – Superman Returns as Lois Lane; Judi Dench – Notes on a Scandal as Barbara Covett; Maggie Gyllenhaal – Stranger than Fiction as Ana Pascal; Shauna MacDonald – The Descent as Sarah Carter; Renée Zellweger – Miss Potter as Beatrix Potter
Best Supporting Actor	Best Supporting Actress
**Ben Affleck – Hollywoodland as George Reeves**; Kelsey Grammer – X-Men: The Last Stand as Hank McCoy / Beast; Philip Seymour Hoffman – Mission: Impossible III as Owen Davian; Sergi López – Pan's Labyrinth as Captain Vidal; James Marsden – Superman Returns as Richard White; Bill Nighy – Pirates of the Caribbean: Dead Man's Chest as Davy Jones	**Famke Janssen – X-Men: The Last Stand as Jean Grey**; Cate Blanchett – Notes on a Scandal as Sheba Hart; Eva Green – Casino Royale as Vesper Lynd; Rachel Hurd-Wood – Perfume: The Story of a Murderer as Laure Richis; Parker Posey – Superman Returns as Kitty Kowalski; Emma Thompson – Stranger than Fiction as Karen Eiffel
Best Young Actor/Actress	Best Director
**Ivana Baquero – Pan's Labyrinth as Ofelia**; Go Ah-sung – The Host as Park Hyun-seo; Jodelle Ferland – Tideland as Jeliza-Rose; Tristan Lake Leabu – Superman Returns as Jason White; Mitchel Musso – Monster House as D.J. Walters; Edward Speleers – Eragon as Eragon	**Bryan Singer – Superman Returns**; J. J. Abrams – Mission: Impossible III; Alfonso Cuarón – Children of Men; Guillermo del Toro – Pan's Labyrinth; Mel Gibson – Apocalypto; Tom Tykwer – Perfume: The Story of a Murderer
Best Screenplay	Best Score
**Michael Dougherty & Dan Harris – Superman Returns**; Andrew Birkin, Bernd Eichinger & Tom Tykwer – Perfume: The Story of a Murderer; Guillermo del Toro – Pan's Labyrinth; Zach Helm – Stranger than Fiction; Neal Purvis, Robert Wade & Paul Haggis – Casino Royale; The Wachowskis – V for Vendetta	**John Ottman – Superman Returns**; David Arnold – Casino Royale; Douglas Pipes – Monster House; John Powell – X-Men: The Last Stand; Trevor Rabin – Flyboys; Tom Tykwer, Johnny Klime & Reinhold Heil – Perfume: The Story of a Murderer
Best Costume Design	Best Make-Up
**Yee Chung-Man – Curse of the Golden Flower**; Joan Bergin – The Prestige; Nic Ede – Flyboys; Judianna Makovsky – X-Men: The Last Stand; Penny Rose – Pirates of the Caribbean: Dead Man's Chest; Sammy Sheldon – V for Vendetta	**Todd Masters, Dan Rebert – Slither**; Howard Berger, Greg Nicotero, Mario Michisanti – The Hills Have Eyes; Paul Hyett, Vickie Lang – The Descent; David Martí, Montse Ribé – Pan's Labyrinth; Ve Neill, Joel Harlow – Pirates of the Caribbean: Dead Man's Chest; Greg Nicotero, Scott Patton – The Texas Chainsaw Massacre: The Beginning
Best Special Effects
**John Knoll, Hal T. Hickel, Charles Gibson, Allen Hall – Pirates of the Caribbean: Dead Man's Chest**; John Bruno, Eric Saindon, Craig Lyn – X-Men: The Last Stand; Jeremy Dawson, Dan Schrecker, Mark G. Soper, Peter Parks – The Fountain; Roger Guyett, Russell Earl, Patrick Tubach, Daniel Sudick – Mission: Impossible III; Karin Joy, John Andrew Berton Jr., Blair Clark, John Dietz – Charlotte's Web; Mark Stetson, Neil Corbould, Richard R. Hoover, Jon Thum – Superman Returns

=== Television ===
==== Programs ====
Best Network TV Series	Best Syndicated/Cable Television Series
**Heroes (NBC)**; Jericho (CBS); Lost (ABC); Smallville (The CW); 24 (Fox); Veronica Mars (The CW)	**Battlestar Galactica (Sci-Fi)**; The Closer (TNT); Dexter (Showtime); Doctor Who (Sci-Fi); Eureka (Sci-Fi); Kyle XY (ABC Family); Stargate SG-1 (Sci-Fi)
Best Television Presentation
**The Librarian: Return to King Solomon's Mines (TNT)**; Life on Mars (BBC One); The Lost Room (Sci-Fi); Masters of Horror (Showtime); Nightmares and Dreamscapes: From the Stories of Stephen King (TNT); 10.5: Apocalypse (NBC)

==== Acting ====
Best Television Actor	Best Television Actress
**Michael C. Hall – Dexter (Showtime) as Dexter Morgan**; Matt Dallas – Kyle XY (ABC Family) as Kyle; Matthew Fox – Lost (ABC) as Jack Shephard; Edward James Olmos – Battlestar Galactica (Sci-Fi) as William Adama; Kiefer Sutherland – 24 (Fox) as Jack Bauer; Noah Wyle – The Librarian: Return to King Solomon's Mines (TNT) as Flynn Carsen	**Jennifer Love Hewitt – Ghost Whisperer (CBS) as Melinda Gordon**; Patricia Arquette – Medium (NBC) as Allison DuBois; Kristen Bell – Veronica Mars (The CW) as Veronica Mars; Evangeline Lilly – Lost (ABC) as Kate Austen; Katee Sackhoff – Battlestar Galactica (Sci-Fi) as Kara Thrace; Kyra Sedgwick – The Closer (TNT) as Brenda Leigh Johnson
Best Supporting Television Actor	Best Supporting Television Actress
**Masi Oka – Heroes (NBC) as Hiro Nakamura**; James Callis – Battlestar Galactica (Sci-Fi) as Gaius Baltar; Michael Emerson – Lost (ABC) as Ben Linus; Greg Grunberg – Heroes (NBC) as Matt Parkman; Josh Holloway – Lost (ABC) as James "Sawyer" Ford; James Remar – Dexter (Showtime) as Harry Morgan	**Hayden Panettiere – Heroes (NBC) as Claire Bennet**; Gabrielle Anwar – The Librarian: Return to King Solomon's Mines (TNT) as Emily Davenport; Jennifer Carpenter – Dexter (Showtime) as Debra Morgan; Ali Larter – Heroes (NBC) as Niki Sanders; Allison Mack – Smallville (The CW) as Chloe Sullivan; Elizabeth Mitchell – Lost (ABC) as Juliet Burke

=== DVD ===
Best DVD Release	Best DVD Special Edition Release
**The Sci-Fi Boys**; 2001 Maniacs; Bambi II; Beowulf & Grendel; The Butterfly Effect 2; Hollow Man 2	**Superman II: The Richard Donner Cut**; The Chronicles of Narnia: The Lion, the Witch and the Wardrobe – Extended Edition; Final Destination 3 – Thrill Ride Edition; King Kong – Deluxe Extended Edition; Oldboy – Ultimate Collector's Edition; Saw II – Unrated Special Edition
Best Classic Film DVD Release	Best DVD Movie Collection
**Godzilla**; Forbidden Planet; Free Enterprise; A Nightmare on Elm Street; The Searchers; She; This Island Earth	**James Bond Ultimate Edition (Collections 1–4)**; The Boris Karloff Collection; The Exorcist – The Complete Anthology; The Premiere Frank Capra Collection; Hollywood Legends of Horror Collection; Superman Ultimate Collector's Edition
Best DVD Television Release	Best Retro Television Series on DVD
**Masters of Horror – The Complete Series**; Deadwood – The Complete Second Season; Doctor Who – The Complete Second Season; Lost – The Complete Second Season; MI-5 – Volume 4; Mystery Science Theater 3000 Collection – V. 9–10	**Adventures of Superman – The Complete Six Seasons**; Amazing Stories – The Complete First Season; Saturday Night Live – The Complete First Season; Star Trek: The Animated Series; Voyage to the Bottom of the Sea – Seasons 1 & 2; The Wild Wild West – The Complete First Season

== Special awards ==
=== The Rising Star Award ===
- Matt Dallas – Kyle XY

=== The Filmmakers Showcase Award ===
- James Gunn – Director (Slither)

=== The Service Award ===
- Kerry O'Quinn – former publisher of Starlog Magazine

=== The Special Recognition Award ===
- Alien Xmas written by Stephen Chiodo & Jim Strain
