= Jane Curtin =

American actress and comedian (born 1947)

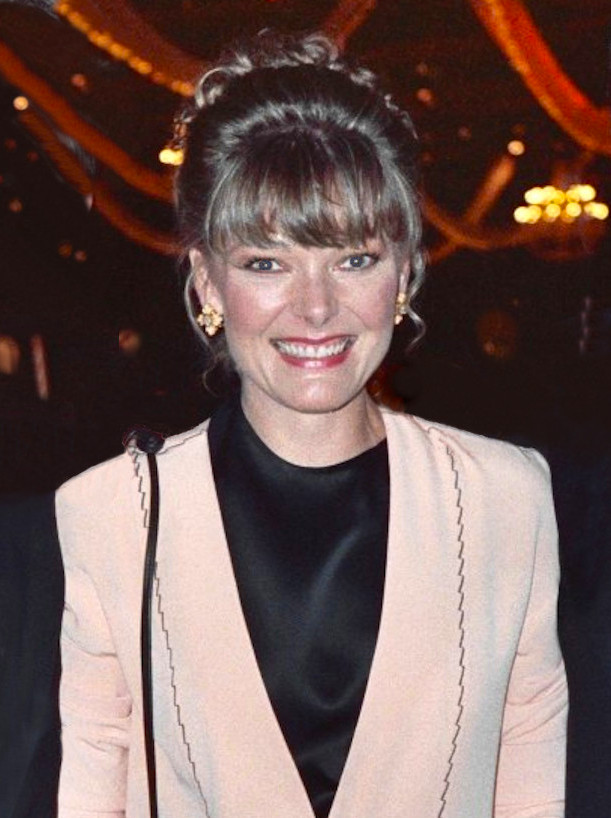
- Curtin in 1989
- Born: Jane Therese Curtin; September 6, 1947 (age 79); Cambridge, Massachusetts, U.S.
- Education: Elizabeth Seton College (AA)
- Occupations: Actress; comedian
- Years active: 1971–present
- Known for: Kate & Allie; Saturday Night Live; 3rd Rock from the Sun; Our Town
- Spouse: Patrick Lynch (m. 1975; died 2025)
- Children: 1
- Relatives: Valerie Curtin (cousin)

Jane Therese Curtin (born September 6, 1947) is an American actress and comedian.

First coming to prominence as an original cast member on the hit TV comedy series Saturday Night Live in 1975, she went on to win back-to-back Emmy Awards for Best Lead Actress in a Comedy Series on the 1980s sitcom Kate & Allie portraying the role of Allison "Allie" Lowell. Curtin later starred in the hit series 3rd Rock from the Sun (1996–2001), playing the role of Dr. Mary Albright.

Curtin has also appeared in many movie roles, including Charlene in The Librarian series of movies (2004–2008). She reprised one of her Saturday Night Live characters, Prymaat (Clorhone) Conehead, in the 1993 film Coneheads. She is sometimes referred to as the "Queen of Deadpan". The Philadelphia Inquirer once called her a "refreshing drop of acid". She was included on a 1986 list of the "Top Prime Time Actors and Actresses of All Time".

== Early life ==
Jane Therese Curtin was born in Cambridge, Massachusetts. Her maternal ancestry is Irish, and her paternal ancestry is also Irish. Her paternal ancestry is originally from Newmarket-on-Fergus, County Clare. Curtin has one younger brother, Larry Curtin, who lives in South Florida; an older sister, Virginia M. "Ginnie" Curtin (d. April 18, 2001); and an oldest brother, John J. "Jack" Curtin (d. September 20, 2008).

She was raised Roman Catholic, and grew up in Wellesley, Massachusetts. She graduated from Newton Country Day School of the Sacred Heart in Newton in 1965. Curtin earned an associate degree from Elizabeth Seton Junior College in New York City, class of 1967. She then attended Northeastern University from 1967 to 1968 before dropping out of college to pursue a career in comedy.

== Career ==
In 1968, Curtin decided to pursue comedy as a career and dropped out of college. She joined a comedy group, The Proposition, and performed with them until 1972. She starred in Pretzels, an off-Broadway play written by Curtin, John Forster, Judith Kahan, and Fred Grandy, in 1974.

=== Saturday Night Live ===
One of the original Not Ready for Prime Time Players of NBC's Saturday Night Live (1975), Curtin remained on the show through the 1979–1980 season. Guest host Eric Idle said that Curtin was "very much a 'Let's come in, let's know our lines, let's do it properly, and go' ... She was very sensible, very focused", and disliked the drug culture in which many of the cast participated. Show writer Al Franken stated that she "was so steady. Had a really strong moral center, and as such was disgusted by much of the show and the people around it".

On the show, and mirroring her own low-key real life, she frequently played straight-woman characters, often as a foil to John Belushi and Gilda Radner. Curtin anchored SNL's "Weekend Update" segment from 1976 to 1977, paired with Dan Aykroyd from 1977 to 1978 and Bill Murray from 1978 to 1980. On occasional "Weekend Update" segments, her newscaster character served as a foil to Belushi, who often gave a rambling and out-of-control "commentary" on events of the day. During these sketches, she timidly tried to get Belushi to come to the point, which would only make him angrier. Curtin's newscaster also introduced baseball expert Chico Escuela (Garrett Morris), a heavily accented Dominican, who started his sketches by saying, "Thank you, Hane", before repeating his famous catchphrase, "Baseball been bery, bery good to me!" She also introduced Roseanne Roseannadanna (Radner) and would listen in exasperated silence at Roseannadanna's disjointed commentary before ultimately cutting her off. In addition, she sang in the "Chevy's Girls" sketch in season two, episode two, alongside Laraine Newman and Radner, and sang again with Newman and Radner as a trio backing up Morris as he sang the song "Three Little Words" for the cold opening of the Season 4 premier episode.

In a parody of the "Point-Counterpoint" segment of the news program 60 Minutes, Curtin delivered a controlled liberal viewpoint (à la Shana Alexander) vs. Aykroyd, who (in the manner of James J. Kilpatrick) epitomized the right-wing view, albeit with an over-the-top "attack" journalist slant. Curtin presented the liberal "Point" portion first. Then Aykroyd presented the "Counterpoint" portion, sometimes beginning with the statement, "Jane, you ignorant slut," to which she replied, "Dan, you pompous ass." The recurring segment has been discussed in an article on "How to Respectfully Disagree" in The Chronicle of Higher Education.

Curtin is also well-known for her role in the Conehead sketches as Prymaat (wife/mother of the Conehead family), and as Enid Loopner (in sketches with Radner and Murray). She is one of many cast members who appear in the retrospective compilation DVD The Women of SNL (2010, 97 minutes).

=== Later television work ===
Unlike many of her fellow SNL cast members who ventured successfully into film, Curtin chose to stay mainly in television, with a few sporadic film appearances. To date, she has starred in two long-running television sitcoms. First, in Kate & Allie (1984–1989), with Susan Saint James, she played a single mother named "Allie Lowell" and twice won the Emmy Award for Best Lead Actress in a Comedy Series.

Following Kate & Allie, Curtin co-starred on the 1990 sitcom Working It Out with Stephen Collins. The series was created by Bill Persky, a writer, director, and producer of Kate & Allie, but it was not successful and was cancelled after 13 episodes. Later, she was part of the cast of 3rd Rock from the Sun (1996–2001) playing a human, Dr. Mary Albright, opposite the alien family composed of John Lithgow, Kristen Johnston, French Stewart, and Joseph Gordon-Levitt. As with SNL, her mostly strait-laced character was often confounded by the zany and whimsical antics of the Solomon family.

In 1997, Curtin narrated two episodes of the documentary television series Understanding, and she has done voice work for Recess and Cyberchase. She guest starred on Sesame Street in 1985.

Curtin also starred with Fred Savage in the ABC sitcom Crumbs, which debuted in January 2006 and was cancelled in May of that year. She also guest-starred on Gary Unmarried as Connie, Allison's mother. In 2012, she joined Unforgettable as Dr. Joanne Webster, a gifted but crusty medical examiner; in 2014, she occasionally reprised her role as the first Guardian on The Librarians. In 2020, she had a co-starring role as a quirky mother-in-law on the ABC sitcom United We Fall.

=== Film ===
In 1980, Curtin starred with Susan Saint James and Jessica Lange in the moderate hit How to Beat the High Cost of Living. In 1993, Curtin and Dan Aykroyd were reunited in Coneheads, a full-length motion picture based on their popular SNL characters. They also appeared together as the voices of a pair of wasps in the film Antz. In 2009, she played Paul Rudd and Andy Samberg's mother in I Love You, Man. In 2013, she took a small role in The Heat as Mrs. Mullins, the mother of Detective Mullins. Curtin played Moira, the Headmistress of the Motherland, in Disney's Godmothered.

=== Other work ===
Curtin has also performed on Broadway on occasion. She first appeared on the Great White Way as Miss Proserpine Garnett in the play Candida in 1981. She later went on to be a replacement actress in two other plays, Love Letters and Noises Off, and was in the 2002 revival of Our Town, which received huge press attention as Paul Newman returned to the Broadway stage after several decades away.

She was appointed as a U.S. Committee National Ambassador for UNICEF.

She also has narrated several audio books, including Carl Hiaasen's novel Nature Girl.

On May 7, 2010, Curtin placed second in the Jeopardy! Million Dollar Celebrity Invitational, winning $250,000 for the U.S. Fund for UNICEF. Michael McKean won the tournament, while Cheech Marin came in third.

She presented the Emmy Awards in 1984, 1987, and 1998; the 11th Annual American Comedy Awards in 1997; and the 54th Annual Golden Globe Awards in 1997.

Curtin has guest hosted several episodes of Selected Shorts produced by Symphony Space and distributed by Public Radio International.

== Personal life ==
Curtin married Patrick Lynch on May 31, 1975. He had graduated from what was then the Yale University School of Drama, and had moved to New York City. When he and Curtin met on a blind date at a hockey game in 1973, he worked in market research at Elizabeth Arden, Inc.. Lynch observed product tests for baby shampoos and sniffed out perfume notes. “He developed strong opinions about a wide variety of products and became a fervent brand loyalist,” said his obituary in The Millerton News.

Lynch eventually became a PBS television producer for two telecasts of American Playhouse. The 1988 telecast titled “Suspicion,” produced by Lynch, had Curtin in a lead role.

Curtin and Lynch lived in New York City before and during her time on Saturday Night Live, then moved to Sharon, Connecticut. They have one daughter. Patrick Lynch died on April 21, 2025 at the age of 79.

== Filmography ==
=== Film ===
Year	Title	Role	Notes
1978	Rabbit Test	Pashima	ref. film credits
1979	Mr. Mike's Mondo Video	Herself/Cameo	
1980	How to Beat the High Cost of Living	Elaine	
1987	O.C. and Stiggs	Elinore Schwab	
1988	Suspicion	Lina McLaidlaw	TV movie
1993	Coneheads	Prymatt Conehead/Mary Margaret DeCicco	
1998	Antz	Muffy	Voice Only
2003	Recess: All Growed Down	Additional Voices	Video
2004	Geraldine's Fortune	Geraldine Liddle	
2005	Brooklyn Lobster	Maureen Giorgio	
2006	The Shaggy Dog	Judge Claire Whittaker	
2009	I Love You, Man	Joyce Klaven	
2011	I Don't Know How She Does It	Marla Reddy	
2013	The Heat	Mrs. Mullins	
2018	The Spy Who Dumped Me	Carol Freeman	
2018	Can You Ever Forgive Me?	Marjorie	
2019	Ode to Joy	Aunt Sylvia	
2020	Godmothered	Moira	
2021	Queen Bees	Janet	
2023	Jules	Joyce	
2026	Back in Black		

=== Television ===
Year	Title	Role	Notes
1975–1980; 2015	Saturday Night Live	Various	Cast member (1975–1980) and a guest appearance on SNL 40th Anniversary Special; 108 episodes Nominated—Primetime Emmy Award for Individual Performance in a Variety or Music Program
1977	The Love Boat	Regina Parker	Episode: "The Captain's Captain/Romance Roulette/Hounded (A Dog's Life)"
1977	What Really Happened to the Class of '65?	Ivy	Episode: "Class Hustler"
1981	Bob & Ray, Jane, Laraine, & Gilda	Herself	TV movie
1982	Candida	Prossie	TV movie
1982	Divorce Wars: A Love Story	Vickey Sturgess	TV movie
1983	The Coneheads	Prymaat (voice)	TV short
1984	Bedrooms	Laura	TV movie
1984–1989	Kate & Allie	Allison 'Allie' Lowell	122 episodes Primetime Emmy Award for Outstanding Lead Actress in a Comedy Series (1984–1985); Nominated—Golden Globe Award for Best Actress – Television Series Musical or Comedy; Nominated—People's Choice Award for Favorite TV Performer (1984–1985); Nominated—Primetime Emmy Award for Outstanding Lead Actress in a Comedy Series
1988	American Playhouse	Lina McLaidlaw	Episode: "Suspicion"
1988	Maybe Baby	Julia Gilbert	TV movie
1990	Common Ground	Alice McGoff	TV movie
1990	Working It Out	Sarah Marshall	13 episodes
1994	Dave's World	Anne	Episode: "Lost Weekend"
1995	Tad	Mary Todd Lincoln	TV movie
1995	Mystery Dance	Susan Baker	Episode: "1.1"
1996–2001	3rd Rock from the Sun	Dr. Mary Albright	137 episodes Satellite Award for Best Actress – Television Series Musical or Comedy; Nominated—Satellite Award for Best Actress – Television Series Musical or Comedy; Nominated—Screen Actors Guild Award for Outstanding Performance by an Ensemble in a Comedy Series
1998	Hercules	Hippolyte (voice)	Episode: "Hercules and the Girdle of Hippolyte"
1998	Recess	Mrs. Clemperer (voice)	Episode: "Wild Child"
2000	Catch a Falling Star	Fran	TV movie
2003	Cyberchase	Lady Ada Byron Lovelace (voice)	Episode: "Hugs and Witches"
2003	Our Town	Mrs. Webb	TV movie Nominated—Satellite Award for Best Supporting Actress – Series, Miniseries or Television Film
2004	The Librarian: Quest for the Spear	Charlene	TV movie
2006	Crumbs	Suzanne Crumb	13 episodes
2006	The Librarian: Return to King Solomon's Mines	Charlene	TV movie
2007	Nice Girls Don't Get the Corner Office	Joy	TV movie
2008	In the Motherhood	Mom	Episode: "Mother Dearest"
2008	The Librarian: Curse of the Judas Chalice	Charlene	TV movie
2008–2009	Gary Unmarried	Connie	2 episodes
2009	Sherri	Margo/Paula's Mom	Episode: "Birth"
2010	The Women of SNL	Various/Prymaat Conehead/Weekend Update	TV movie; archive footage
2010	Rex Is Not Your Lawyer	Unknown	Episode: "Pilot"
2011	The Oprah Winfrey Show	Herself (guest)	Episode: "Saturday Night Live Class Reunion"
2012–2014	Unforgettable	Joanne Webster	34 episodes
2014–2017	The Librarians	Charlene	5 episodes
2015	The Good Wife	Judge Farley	Episode: "Bond"
2017	Broad City	Margo	Episode: "Witches"
2019–2021	The Good Fight	Judge Pamela Farley	3 episodes
2020	United We Fall	Sandy Ryan	8 episodes
2022	The Conners	Doris Goldufski	Episode: "The Dog Days of Christmas"
2023	Bupkis	Marie LaRocca	Episode: "Do as I Say, Not as I do"
2025	The Residence	Nan Cox, mother-in-law to the POTUS	

== Theatre ==
Year	Title	Role	Notes
1981	Candida	Proserpine Garnett	
1989	Love Letters	Melissa Gardner	Replacement
2002	Noises Off	Dotty Otley	Replacement
2002	Our Town	Mrs. Webb	

Media offices
Preceded by Chevy Chase	Weekend Update anchor 1976–1977	Succeeded by Dan Aykroyd and Jane Curtin
Preceded by Jane Curtin	Weekend Update anchor (with Dan Aykroyd); 1977–1978	Succeeded by Jane Curtin and Bill Murray
Preceded by Jane Curtin and Dan Aykroyd	Weekend Update anchor (with Bill Murray); 1978–1980	Succeeded by Charles Rocket
