= List of The Librarian characters =

This is a list of characters in The Librarian series. They are all characters who have appeared either in the Librarian television films, or the Librarians series.

== Overview ==
Creator of The Librarians, John Rogers, noted that Dean Devlin wanted to make a television version of the Librarian movies, in the style of the revived Doctor Who series. Unfortunately, because Noah Wyle was still doing Falling Skies, and Bob Newhart and Jane Curtin were going to be available only periodically, Rogers had to come up with a new approach, noting that Wyle did not want to be recast or replaced as the Librarian, so Rogers came up with the idea of creating a new team of heroes in the style of Doc Savage and team of experts approach. He notes that "Jacob Stone was written with Christian Kane in mind. He worked very hard on Leverage, and he choreographed all of his own fights", "Lindy Booth just straight-up out auditioned everybody" for the role of Cassandra, John Kim won his role by "just being charming as hell", and Rebecca Romijn is someone who "could throw a punch and who could land a joke". He also notes that John Larroquette's role is essentially a replacement for Bob Newhart's Judson, so they had to find someone with "a very specific sense of humor" and "somebody with insane chops".

Editors Patricia Demers and Toni Samek, in their book "Minds Alive: Libraries and Archives Now", note that libraries are often identified with the aspirational, and as a result, viewers gleefully accept the heroic characters in "The Librarians", far removed from the typical safe, stereotypical representation of librarians In her book "The Laughing Librarian", Jeanette C. Smith, compares Flynn Carsen to Indiana Jones, adventuring with the supernatural, but notes that Flynn's superpower is his "superior research skills". Biographer Jonathan M. Farlow refers to Carsen as a "swashbuckling" hero who relies on "his wits". Author Karen A. Romanko compares the show to Warehouse 13 in her book "Women of Science Fiction and Fantasy Television", and describes the key characters in "The Librarians", highlighting Colonel Baird's role as not only the protector of the lives of the librarians, but also of their immortal souls. She also notes how Cassandra's brain tumour gives her powers that help the team.

== Main characters ==
=== Flynn Carsen ===
Portrayed by Noah Wyle.

A nerdish bookworm, Flynn is brilliant beyond compare. By the time he was 31 years old, he had earned 22 academic degrees—12 Bachelor's degrees, 6 Master's degrees, and 4 doctorates—including four degrees in Egyptology, a doctorate in Comparative Religions, and a Ph.D. in Cryptology. In the beginning of The Quest for the Spear, his Egyptology professor signs off on his 23rd degree. (The precise degree is not known, but it must be either a master's degree or a Ph.D, because he already possesses a B.A., a B.S. or both in the relevant field.)

Practically addicted to learning, Flynn would have continued being a perpetual student had Professor Harris not awarded him the degree mid-term, making it impossible for him to sign up for another course for six months. Observing that Flynn did not know the names of any of his fellow students, the professor insisted that he get some real-world experience. Upon receiving a magical invitation, Flynn (asking how did they do that?) applied for a job as a librarian in the New York Metropolitan Library. He was successful in his job interview and was recruited into an ancient clandestine order of Librarians who have protected a range of historical and often magical items (such as the Ark of the Covenant) for centuries.

Flynn is a polymath, highly intelligent and resourceful. He often gives voice to his speed-of-light thinking, which can be confusing—and annoying—to bystanders. A natural gift and years of study have made his powers of observation and deductive skills comparable to those of Sherlock Holmes. His ordinary skills (which did not qualify him for the job) include knowledge of the Dewey decimal system, the Library of Congress, research paper orthodoxy, web searching, and the ability to set up an RSS feed. En route to his first mission, Flynn managed to decode the previously untranslated Language of the Birds in just over seven hours, a feat that no other Librarian (save the one who created the book) had been able to accomplish. Flynn rapidly evolves into a brave hero, not easily overwhelmed by the supernatural.

When Flynn was still quite young, his father was shot by an unknown assailant. It took many years for Flynn to identify the murderer and discover the reasons behind it. He took clarinet lessons when he was young, and when he was nine years old he attended a book signing of Stephen Hawking where he began to argue with Hawking about the correctness of the central thesis of the book.

His geeky bookishness is coupled with a razor-sharp wit that unfortunately has a habit of manifesting itself at the worst times. Flynn really hates being corrected. He is a bit awkward meeting women, and his mother is constantly trying to set him up on dates. Over his first 10 years as Librarian, he is too busy globe-trotting and fighting evil to maintain a relationship, and after the deaths of two great loves he stays clear of emotional entanglements until he meets Colonel Eve Baird in the first episode of the TV series.

By the end of the third and last movie, he has fully embraced his destiny as the Librarian. During The Librarians series he is forced to step back from his usual duties when Charlene and Judson displace the Library in time and space in a desperate effort to protect it from evil forces ("And the Crown of King Arthur") Through its Annex, the Library prompts Flynn to track down three people—Ezekiel Jones, Cassandra Cillian and Jacob Stone—whom the Library invited to apply at the same time it recruited Flynn, 10 years before. None of them applied. Once found—and convinced of their callings—they formed a team of Librarians and assumed Flynn's usual responsibilities of retrieving and protecting supernatural artifacts and guarding the Library and humanity from evil, while he dedicates himself to finding the Library and learning how to bring it back. Flynn returns when the situation requires his expertise—or when he needs them. In the series finale of The Librarians, Flynn undergoes the tethering ceremony to spiritually tie him to the Library making him an immortal and filling the vacancy left after Judson's death.

There is a running joke throughout the series: No matter what the situation, when Flynn announces or introduces himself with the words "I am The Librarian" he is accepted as a person with a right to be there, no matter how inappropriate the context. Cassandra, Ezekial and Jacob try this repeatedly, but it does not always work for them. Flynn then reveals in the beginning of the episode, "And the Curse of Cindy", that he uses magic in order to convince people whenever they question who he is, which momentarily shocked Jacob who despises using magic. In the last episode of The Librarians, it saves the world.

Noah Wyle describes the character as "Indiana Jones played by Don Knotts", and describes his journey as going from someone who was "a professional student ... incredibly comfortable in the realm of academia" to someone who "has a touch of madness about him now, his people skills are wanting, he's very irreverent and very eccentric." As well as acting, Wyle contributed to the writing and directing of episodes of "The Librarians". Literary Hub rated Flynn Carsen as 18th best fictional librarian. Wyle was nominated for Saturn Awards for his portrayal of the character in all three TV movies in 2005, 2007 and 2009.

=== Charlene ===
Portrayed by Jane Curtin.

The humorless, no-nonsense library administrator who interviews Flynn for the job of 'The Librarian'. Flynn was granted the position after he was able to tell Charlene very specific things about her only a few minutes after their first meeting, based solely on his keen observation (among them, having mononucleosis, being divorced two months before, owning three cats, and breaking her nose as a child) and after answering a single question from an unseen Judson, "What's more important than knowledge?" with his mother's wise words: "The things that make life worth living can not be thought here (pointing to his head), they must be felt here (hand over heart)."

In her role as administrator, Charlene is a consummate bureaucrat, threatening to dock Flynn's pay should he break something and insisting that he keep his receipts if he wishes to get refunds for the expenses of his adventures. She keeps a straight face when Flynn makes jokes. In her words, she does not "do funny."

In the TV series' first episode, "And the Crown of King Arthur", after Dulaque's attack on the Library, Judson and Charlene cast a spell to sever the Library from this plane in order to protect it.

In the season three episode "And the Fangs of Death", Charlene has retired to a remote Incan temple and wants nothing to do with the Library. Carsen seeks her out, and she agrees to return to help defeat Apep, but the next day her servants are dead and she's missing. Carsen finally finds her in Shangri-La in the episode "And the Fatal Separation". He discovers that she's been hiding among Sterling Lam's collection of supernatural beings and artifacts. Fearing that Apep could use her to access the Library, she's planning on sacrificing herself, severing her connection to it by giving up her immortality. Finally, Jenkins sends her to another plane of existence, where she rejoins Judson. Among her last words is the injunction to keep receipts. In the next episode, she talks with Flynn through a mirror.

Charlene's recent divorce is first mentioned in the movie "The Quest for the Spear", In the movie, "Curse of the Judas Chalice", Charlene reveals more about her divorce, saying her duty to the Library is what cost her her marriage, and revealing that her ex-husband is named Gaston. It is later stated in the episode "And the Fatal Separation" that Jenkins loved her and that she chose Judson. In the episode "And the Eternal Question", Jenkins tells Cassandra that his true love (whom we later find out is Charlene) chose another after he "had already pledged his heart to her for all eternity".

Dean Devlin speculated that Charlene had in her youth served as the Guardian to a Librarian, as Nicole did. This was officially made part of her history in the episode "... and the Fangs of Death."

=== Judson ===
Portrayed by Bob Newhart.

Judson, as he is introduced in the first film, has previously served as 'The Librarian' and now acts as a mentor to those who take up the mantle. He has a tattoo from a time he served in the Marines and is very handy in a fight. He is able to use mirrors, television screens, and a technique resembling astral projection to communicate with the Librarian anywhere in the world, frequently at less-than-convenient times and places. He dies after the third film, five years before the first episode of the TV series. Flynn keeps his portrait, draped with crape, next to his desk. He tells Eve that Judson is still there in spirit; she is shocked to find this to be the simple truth when Judson appears in the full-length mirror that stands near his portrait.

It is hinted in the film Curse of the Judas Chalice that Judson may be the original founder of the Library, although he finds the suggestion that he might be more than 2000 years old "insulting". In season four of the series, however, it is confirmed that he is the original Librarian, that Charlene was his Guardian, and they performed the Tethering ritual that is one of the story arcs in that season. When the Serpent Brotherhood invades the Library, Judson and Charlene conduct a ritual that severs the Library from the physical reality's plane of existence and sends it into the void. Towards the end of season three, Charlene goes to join him into the void after dying.

Bob Newhart said he was surprised at the success of the first movie, because of the message "that it's all right to be smart, which is not the most common message in popular culture", and that he loved the script and his character.

=== Margie Carsen ===
Portrayed by Olympia Dukakis.

Flynn's mother, Margie, is constantly worried about her son and encourages him to get a job, find a bride, and be happy. She plays MahJong, likes to give surprise birthday parties and enjoys singing karaoke. She was delighted to meet Nicole at the end of the first film. It is revealed in the series premiere of "The Librarians" that she has died and that Judson helped Flynn through his mourning.

== Introduced in Quest for the Spear ==
=== Edward Wilde ===
Portrayed by Kyle MacLachlan.

Edward Wilde was the 'Librarian' before Flynn, and he was considered to be very good. He worked with Nicole for two years during which time she fell in love with him. During an adventure in the Antarctic involving the Serpent Brotherhood, Wilde had to build an igloo to shelter himself and Nicole. He made it appear to Nicole that he had been killed by the Serpent Brotherhood, but in reality Edward staged his own death to ally himself with the Brotherhood in an effort to steal the Spear of Destiny and take control of the world.

=== Nicole Noone ===
Portrayed by Sonya Walger, and Rachel Nichols in the TV series.

Nicole is an adventurer who works for the library as the Librarian's Guardian, and usually serves as the brawn to the Librarian's brains. She is the youngest of three siblings and the only girl. Her mother is English, and her father is South American (Argentine), but she never bothered to learn Spanish. She never had any pets, and her favorite stone is jade (as mentioned in The Librarian: Quest for the Spear). She is fearless, loves adventure, and is an excellent fighter. She developed feelings for the previous Librarian, Edward Wilde, and felt an overwhelming sense of guilt when he was apparently killed. Judson told Flynn to "trust no one", a pun of Nicole's surname Noone.

In The Librarians it is revealed that Nicole got trapped five hundred years in the past while going after H.G. Wells' Time Machine with Flynn. She becomes angry and bitter that Flynn never returned for her. Now immortal, Nicole acts as the primary antagonist of the fourth season, causing the death of Jenkins, the dissolution of the Library and a rift between the Librarians. After the Library is restored, Flynn uses an artifact to go back in time to the moment that Nicole first became immortal in order to right his wrong of never going back for her. Flynn convinces Nicole that she needs to remain in the past and still have her adventures, but this time to have them for the Library instead of against it. Nicole agrees, stating that she realizes now she is the Guardian of the Library itself instead of Flynn and promises that she will see Flynn again in five hundred years. When Flynn returns to the future, he finds that time has been altered and all of the evil that Nicole caused has been undone. Only Flynn and Baird ever remember Nicole's evil actions.

== Introduced in Return to King Solomon's Mines ==
=== "Uncle" Jerry ===
Portrayed by Robert Foxworth.

Jerry was a close friend of Flynn's father, whom he met in 1967, He knew both of Flynn's parents when they met and began courting. Jerry is wealthy and runs a global import-export business. In the course of an adventure to discover King Solomon's Mines, Flynn discovers that Jerry had always been jealous of Flynn's father. He wants to use the power of the Mines to turn back time so he can win the affections of Margie Carsen: He feels that she was stolen from him. It turns out Jerry was the unknown figure who shot Flynn's father, after Carsen refused to tell Jerry about the Mines.

=== Emily Davenport ===
Portrayed by Gabrielle Anwar.

Emily is an archaeologist who holds twenty-five degrees, three more than Flynn, and can argue convincingly about ancient history, Biblical texts, and geography. Emily teams up with Flynn to search for King Solomon's Mines, and may still be in Africa trying to prove that the Queen of Sheba actually ruled most, if not all, of Africa.

== Introduced in Curse of the Judas Chalice ==
=== Professor Lazlo / Vlad Dracula ===
Portrayed by Bruce Davison.

An elderly, crippled man who is a brilliant professor at the University of Bucharest. Seemingly harmless, he is taken hostage by the villainous Kubichek, who wants Lazlo to lead him to the Judas Chalice. After Kubichek unsuccessfully attempts to resurrect what he thinks is the skeleton of Dracula/Vlad the Impaler, a legendary Romanian warlord-turned-vampire, Lazlo reveals he is Dracula and the skeleton belonged to a peasant. After drinking from a victim infected by Cholera hundreds of years ago, he became weakened, assuming an almost-human, crippled form. Since then, he has searched for the Judas Chalice, hoping to reawaken his evil powers. After drinking from the Judas Chalice, Dracula regains his powers and battles Flynn and Simone Renoir. Flynn is able to trick Dracula with the Judas Chalice and then impale him through the heart with a stake made from an aspen tree, the same kind of tree from which Judas Iscariot hung himself. Dracula dies, releasing the souls of all of his victims and burning to ash in the process.

=== Simone Renoir ===
Portrayed by Stana Katic.

A gorgeous young New Orleans jazz-club singer, who uses her hypnotic performances to charm an off-guard Flynn. Turned into a vampire some 400 years ago, Simone considers it her two-fold destiny to find the man who condemned her soul to walk the night forever and exact vengeance, and to help protect one of the clues leading to the Judas Chalice. She teams up with Flynn to outwit those hoping to find the Chalice and use it for their evil agendas. While protecting the Chalice, Simone recognizes Professor Lazlo as her sire. Lazlo turns out to be Dracula. He restores his powers with the Chalice, leading to a battle between Dracula, Flynn and Simone. Though Simone is defeated, Flynn kills Dracula using a stake made from an aspen tree. With Dracula, her sire, dead, Simone's soul is finally able to find peace. Simone rejects Flynn's offers to return to New York with him or to turn Flynn so that he can spend eternity with her. Instead, Simone chooses to watch the sunrise for the first time in centuries with Flynn, allowing herself to be killed by the sunlight so that she can finally rest in peace.

=== Sergei Kubichek ===
Portrayed by Dikran Tulaine.

A former KGB agent and Secretary of Defense for the Russian Federation, Kubichek longs to restore the order and power of the former Soviet Union. He is the mastermind of a risky plot to secure the Judas Chalice, resurrect Vlad Dracula, and use him to create an army of invincible vampire soldiers. Unfortunately, the plan backfires when Professor Lazlo reveals himself to be Count Dracula and he is vampirized as a result. Nonetheless, he retains his goal to revitalize the Soviet Union. He is later killed by a grenade at the hands of Ivan, who is killed in the process.

== Introduced in The Librarians ==
=== Eve Baird ===
Portrayed by Rebecca Romijn.

A counter-terrorism agent who is selected by the Library as the first Guardian in 10 years. She is generally given her rank and called "Colonel Baird". The source of her first name is revealed in "And Santa's Midnight Run": She was born at midnight on Christmas Eve. In the series finale of The Librarians, Baird undergoes the tethering ceremony to spiritually tie her to the Library making her an immortal and filling the vacancy left after Charlene's death.

Rebecca Romijn said she was attracted to the role because she "grew up loving Indiana Jones", and was even more "in love with [the series] because of the comic tone" Romijn was nominated for Saturn Awards for her portrayal of the character in 2015 and 2016.

=== Jacob Stone ===
Portrayed by Christian Kane.

An Oklahoma oil-rigger and genius with an IQ of 190. An autodidact, he has extensive knowledge of ancient and modern history, world cultures, art and architecture (including the relevant sciences). He speaks 9 languages and can read more than a dozen more. He taught himself to read Greek at night, presumably as a child. He has honorary degrees at universities on four continents. He is "the first one they call when they discover a new piece of art and the one they're afraid to call because I'm the best in the world at discovering a fake." For 20 years he has written scholarly works using pseudonyms representing 7 carefully constructed identities, including Dr. Oliver Thompson, James McKelvie, and Griffin Griffould. He was invited to interview for the position of the Librarian 10 years ago (when Flynn was successful), but did not respond to the invitation because he felt obligated to help keep his family's oil-drilling business afloat. He was a "Librarian-in-training", working alongside Ezekiel Jones and Cassandra Cillian, until being promoted at the end of "And the Loom of Fate". He is currently banned from the Vatican Museum for attempting to rearrange the art there while under the influence of the Apple of Discord. In "What Lies Beneath the Stones" he encounters his father, Isaac Stone, sole proprietor of Stone Family Rigging and Pipeline. Isaac has run the business into the ground, partly because of his alcoholism and gambling. Isaac is sexist, shows contempt for Native American culture and cuts corners in dangerous ways. He constantly belittles Jake, who didn't tell his father the truth about himself because he knew that Isaac would see anything less than chasing the family business as a betrayal. The lies Isaac told to get this drilling project going unleashed Okonote, a deadly shapeshifter: "So many lies from one man," the creature says. Jacob reveals himself to his father, who says "You're my son and I love you," and hugs him. Jacob instantly recognizes the shapeshifter, saying that his father would die before he ever told him that. He leaves without confronting his real father, but back at the Library, he changes the byline on the article he is writing to his real name.

In the pilot episode of The Librarians: The Next Chapter, Jacob rescues a Librarian from 1847, Vikram Chamberlain, after the latter had been imprisoned for close to 200 years by the artifact known as the Scarab of Horus. He informs Vikram that he can never return to his own time due to consequences of time travel. After rejecting Jacob's stance, Vikram proceeds to reactivate the Annex connected to the Library located in Belgrade and releases magic into the world again. Needing help, Jacob calls on Charlie Cornwall, a former Guardian candidate, to watch over Vikram. At the end of the Season 1 opener, Jacob gives Vikram six months to rectify the damage he has done or he will bring him to the main Library to live out the rest of his life in peace and away from the outside world while also tasking Charlie to act as an unofficial Guardian for Vikram during those six months.

Christian Kane noted that he enjoys the physical aspects of the role; "I do all the fighting; I do all my own stunts ... that's my specialty – fighting on camera." Kane was nominated for a Saturn Award for his portrayal of the character in 2018.

=== Cassandra Cillian ===
Portrayed by Lindy Booth.

A mathematician and scientist with synesthesia - the special gift of auditory and sensory hallucinations linked to memory retrieval. She also has a touch of magic, Cassandra is a rare case with which all five of her senses can be connected to her memories at any given time. Her synesthesia is originally supposed to be caused by a brain tumor, described as being the size of a grape. It is lethal, but it is under control at the beginning of the series. She was invited to interview for the position of Librarian 10 years ago (when Flynn was successful), but was in the hospital at that time. She was a "Librarian-in-training", working alongside Ezekiel Jones and Jacob Stone, from the end of the pilot until being promoted at the end of "And the Loom of Fate".

In "And the Cost of Education" she is intrigued by college life because she was too sick to attend. In that episode, she is pulled into another world where she is invited to join the Lake, a secret organization of women who realized long ago that magic and science would become one. She has seen their forum on line. They offer her the chance to learn, study and grow with them, but she declines to join them because of her loyalty to her work as a Librarian. Jenkins tells her to be on her guard: In the age-old debate about what to do about magic, the Lake has always been "ambitious."

Cassandra reveals to Ezekiel and Jacob in "What Lies Beneath the Stones" that, knowing the tumor will eventually kill her, she has chosen a specific day to die. In the episode "And the Eternal Question" she is forced to have the tumor removed and as a result her mathematical abilities are greatly enhanced, and she gains the power to communicate telepathically. In that same episode, it is shown that Cassandra is physically and romantically attracted to both men and women; she asked Jenkins out on a date (who rebuffed her advances due to their massive age difference) and kissed the vampire Estrella at the end of the episode.

In the pilot episode of The Librarians: The Next Chapter, Cassandra is mentioned but does not make an appearance. Jacob explains to Vikram Chamberlain that it was actually Cassandra that figured out when and where Vikram could be freed from his imprisonment and tasked him to save their fellow Librarian.

Lindy Booth was a fan of the Librarian movies before being cast and loves "the sense of humor in the series, which is perfect for families". She said of her character, Cassandra, that she is an "interesting and fascinating girl" and that it was "a challenging part, because she ... seen her whole life as being cursed, and she's never been happy or comfortable with who she is. So to be able to go on this journey and find acceptance for Cassandra in her 20s, and finally feeling like her curse is a gift, was really exciting to me. So I couldn't wait to do that." Booth was nominated for a Saturn Award for her portrayal of the character in 2016.

=== Ezekiel Jones ===
Portrayed by John Harlan Kim.

A world-class thief who supposedly looks out for no one but himself. He is also a "master of technologies." He was invited to attend the interview process to become the 'Librarian' 10 years ago (when Flynn was successful), but he is a loner and decided not to attend the interview because he believed he received the letter by mistake. He was a "Librarian-in-training", working alongside Cassandra Cillian and Jacob Stone, from the end of the pilot until being promoted at the end of "And the Loom of Fate".

Ezekiel and his sisters were raised by their adoptive mother to be thieves. She doesn't take him seriously until "And the Christmas Thief," when the Saint of Thieves compliments Ezekiel on his exploits. She then demands to know where her cut is. He explains that he has used his ill-gotten gains to support charities and help people in need; that is why the Library invited him.

In the season two episode "And What Lies Beneath the Stones," Jones confesses that after his first big score, he was recruited by MI6 to use his skills as a thief on behalf of the British government. He is embarrassed about this.

John Kim feels that his character started off as a "young and arrogant rascal", and he matured a little, but he is still "immodest and big-headed" because "it's just part of his nature".

=== Jenkins / Galahad ===
Portrayed by John Larroquette.

The new quartet's reluctant, sometimes cantankerous caretaker; he has worked at the Library's branch office, known as the Annex, "for longer than anyone knows," and has extensive knowledge of ancient lore. He is seen to have a connection to Dulaque, as revealed in "And the Apple of Discord". It is later explained that he is the immortal Knight of the Round Table Sir Galahad from King Arthur's Camelot, and he and Dulaque, the assumed identity of Sir Lancelot du Lac, are immortal (Lancelot's immortality is explained in The Librarians: The Next Chapter as a result of drawing on the power of his shield, though the cause of Galahad's immortality is unknown). He has known Morgan le Fay (Alicia Witt) for centuries and considers her to be his archenemy, as he blames her for Arthur's death. In "And Some Dude Named Jeff", he confirms that he is Lancelot's illegitimate son. In "And The Graves of Time", he gives up his immortality to bring Nicole Noone back to life after she's killed by a revengeful Rasputin. He's at first unprepared to handle the many shortcomings of being an older human, (poor eyesight and hearing, the need to eat) but soon comes to accept that this is his life now for however long that may be. His immortality is returned in "And the Echoes of Memory" when Flynn persuades Nicole to work for the Library instead of against it and thereby changes history.

Larroquette was nominated for a Saturn Award for his portrayal of the character in 2015.

=== Dulaque / Lancelot du Lac ===
Portrayed by Matt Frewer; Jerry O'Connell as a younger version; Philip Rosch in The Next Chapter.

The mysterious immortal leader of the Serpent Brotherhood. In the episode "...And the Apple of Discord" it is heavily implied that he is either Sir Lancelot du Lac or Sir Hector de Maris when one of the members of the Conclave calls him "The son of Ban". Dulaque was established as Sir Lancelot in the episode "And the Loom of Fate".

In the episode "And Going Medieval" of The Librarians: The Next Chapter, a younger version of Lancelot from the year 847 appears. It is revealed that Elaine of Astolat, his fellow Camelot knight in King Arthur's Round Table, was also his lover. He went out of his way to remove all traces of Elaine being a knight when she fled Camelot. During the episode, he finally is able to utilize the artifact, the Shield of Lancelot, that made its user invincible in battle and granted the user immortality as a permanent side effect. Elaine used his pride as a knight against him and challenged Lancelot to one-on-one combat without the use of the artifact. She defeated him and regained possession of the shield, which made her both immortal and invincible against all of Lancelot's forces. With his army having fled, Lancelot walks away in shame not before claiming that he will rise again.

=== Lamia ===
Portrayed by Lesley-Ann Brandt.

Dulaque's second-in-command in the Serpent Brotherhood. Believes that bringing magic back and achieving power will allow them to make the world a better place. She is a skilled martial artist and sword fighter. Dulaque kills her in "And the Loom of Fate".

== Introduced in The Librarians: The Next Chapter ==
=== Vikram Chamberlain ===
Portrayed by Callum McGowan.

In the pilot episode, Charlie states the Library maintains a file on Vikram in its archives. The file notes that Vikram was born in India and received his education at the University of Oxford. The Library recruited him in 1832. Between 1832 and 1847, he operated without a Guardian assigned; referring to Guardians as "nannies". Though he did work with Elaine, who was assigned as caretaker of his Annex to the Library located in Belgrade. In 1847, Vikram went undercover as an advisor to General Bogdan Gregor, who was pursuing the Sword of Mars, a powerful artifact that he could use to conquer all of Europe. During his time undercover, he fell in love with General Gregor's fiancée, Anya. When General Gregor finally found the Sword of Mars, Vikram intervened and used the Scarab of Horus to trap both of them within a time bubble outside of regular time and space. He originally planned for a colleague to pull him out of artifact's prison, but after he was killed by General Gregor's men; Vikram spent roughly 200 years in the prison until Jacob Stone released him in 2025.

After being told he can never return to his original time and will never be with Anya again, Vikram reactivates his Annex in hopes of finding a way to return to the past and accidentally releases magic on the local ley lines which cause dormant artifacts to reawaken. Season 1 focuses on Vikram's endeavors to correct his mistake and adjust to being forced to stay in the future. Jacob gives him six months to rectify his mistake or he would be brought to the main Library to live out the remainder of his life in peace, but away from the outside world. Unknown to his team, Vikram has been collecting artifacts in order to build a time machine and return to 1847. In "And Going Medieval", Elaine reveals to him that he fathered a son with Anya which pushed him to use his time machine to reunite with Anya and their son. By the end of the episode after choosing to return his team to their correct time, he abandons his desire to return to 1847 and accepts that his fate is to remain with the last of his family, Lysa, who is confirmed to be his great-great-great-great-granddaughter. In the Season 1 finale, he is given the chance to use an artifact to say farewell to Anya and their son.

Charlie and Elaine both inform Vikram that the Library's archives did not put him in good standing as Charlie referred to him as a "bad Librarian" in their first meeting. In the episode, "And the Dance of Doom", both Elaine and Lady Midday (Dame Anna Mirinoff) confirmed that he is called "The Rogue Librarian". His reputation is largely due to his over-reliance on magic for missions and his tendency to utilize artifacts without permission instead of placing them in the Library. Vikram also showed he does not always care for the Library's rules when he invited Connor and Lysa to join him and Charlie on their missions despite them not being formally chosen to serve the Library.

=== Lysa Pascal ===
Portrayed by Olivia Morris.

Lysa is a mathematician, engineer, and physicist, who is attempting to build a start up company focused on developing predictive algorithms. In the pilot episode, she comes to Belgrade after inheriting a castle. She is then introduced to magic when she meets Vikram and learns that the castle hosts an Annex to the Library. Even though she is skeptical on magic being real, she joins Vikram and the team with the notion that magic is simply an unknown science to humanity and a desire to understand it. By the end of Season 1, she has accepted that magic is indeed real and is formally invited by the Library to be a Librarian.

In the first episode, she explains that her parents were killed in a car accident. After she sees a painting of Anya and her remarkable physical resemblance to herself, she attempts to learn from Vikram more about Anya - only to be rebuffed. In "And the Ghost Train", she uses a girls-only brunch to pump Charlie for information and learns that Anya is her great-great-great-great-grandmother and was Vikram's lover in 1847. In the episode "And Going Medieval", after learning that Vikram is the father to Anya's only son, it is confirmed that Vikram is Lysa's great-great-great-great-grandfather. At the end of episode, she is shown grateful to have a living family member in her life and enjoys teasing Vikram over potential nicknames to give her new ancestral grandparent (much to the latter's annoyance).

=== Connor Green ===
Portrayed by Bluey Robinson.

Connor is a former university professor turned into a video-streaming conspiracy theorist. In the pilot episode, he had come to Belgrade to investigate a rumor that a castle there hosted an Annex to the legendary Library which he would later learn is true along with meeting two Librarians, Vikram Chamberlain and Jacob Stone. He reveals to Lysa that he received degrees in history at Harvard University and the University of Cambridge. He was teaching at the University of Stuttgart while completing his Master's program. Connor chose to release a paper explaining how vampires were real, which lost him his teaching position and his credibility in the history field. By the end of the first episode, he asks to join Vikram and Charlie on their missions which Vikram accepts despite Connor not being a Librarian or Guardian. Throughout the first season, Connor tries multiple times to capture on video his adventures with the team that prove that magic is real only for the proof to be damaged or changed by the Library's magic to protect itself. By the end of Season 1, Connor is formally invited to be a Librarian by the Library.

In "And the Con-Con", Connor explained that he turned to live video-streaming as a means to finance his continued research into magic and the supernatural. His internet handle was "King Con" and gathered a large internet following and fanbase that called themselves the "Spectral Snoops". He became close to one of his fans, Pedro Worth, who he saw as a surrogate little brother. It also revealed that when he decided to serve the Library that he completely stopped posting videos and gave no explanation to his fanbase on his disappearance.

=== Charlie Cornwall ===
Portrayed by Jessica Green.

Charlie is a Guardian candidate that was rejected and returned to her job in the U.S. military. In "And the Ghost Train", she explains to Lysa that she was invited by the Library along with three other candidates for the chance of becoming a new Guardian. By the end of their trial, the other three candidates were chosen by the Library to stay and became official Guardians with Charlie being the only one cast out. In the pilot episode, Jacob calls her in and is given a second chance to serve the Library after Vikram, a Librarian from the past, is brought into present day and accidentally releases magic into the world again. She is given a six-month assignment to act as Vikram's Guardian while he works to correct his mistake. She extends her protection to Lysa and Connor as well after Vikram invites them to join in their adventures despite the Library not formally inviting either of them. In the Season 1 finale, Charlie is formally invited by the Library to become an official Guardian (making her the fifth active Guardian).
