= Knights of Camelot =

Arthurian board game published in 1980

Knights of Camelot is a fantasy board game published in 1980 by TSR.

Front cover of box, art by Kenneth Rahman (Eymoth), 1980

== Setting ==
Knights of Camelot is a board game set during the reign of King Arthur. The players take on the roles of chivalrous new knights who go forth to fight evil and right wrongs. The Knight earns Chivalry Points and Virtue Points in the hopes of one day becoming a Knight of the Round Table. The mechanism to discern a Knight's true worth is Virtue Level, which is calculated by dividing Chivalry Points by Virtue Points. The lower the Virtue Level, the more virtuous the knight. As game designer Charles Vasey pointed out, "a Knight who grows mighty without caring for his immortal soul, or remembering the Poor and the Church of God, will find his Virtue Level getting bigger (whereas in this game ... a low Virtue Level is what you want)."

== Components ==
The game comes with:

- a map
- a 36-page rule book
- die-cut counters for knights, other personalities, items and monsters
- 75 Knight cards, 15 King cards and 30 Lady cards
- three dice
- A sheet of reference tables

== Publication history ==
Knight of Camelot was designed by Glenn and Kenneth Rahman. The box art was by Kenneth Rahman (under the pseudonym Eymoth) and Erol Otus, and interior art was by Jeff Dee, David S. LaForce, David C. Sutherland III, and Kenneth Rahman. The map was designed by Darlene Pekul.

In the February 1982 edition of Dragon (Issue #58), game designer Glenn Rahmann published alternate rules for players who wanted to play evil knights, called knaves.

== Reception ==
In the August–September 1980 edition of White Dwarf (Issue #26), Charles Vasey found the game had "a pleasing design [and] a helpful set of counters." However, he found that because the game's random encounters came from finite tables, "you will find that the game gets samey after quite a few plays", although Vasey did admit this would take some time, since "the designers have provided lots of these tables." Vasey admired the Virtue Level mechanism for judging a knight's purity. But he found the map "a little unexciting and rather small, and hence rather featureless"; he suggested swapping the map with that of another game such as Chaosium's King Arthur's Knights. He concluded by giving the game an average rating of 7 out of 10, stating that this was "a well-designed game that succeeds at all it essays."

In King Arthur in America, Alan Lupack and Barbara Tep Lupack identified Knights of Camelot as part of a growing trend in the 1970s to move games involving Arthurian legend from simplistic fare for children to increasingly sophisticated adult games.

In Marketing Arthur: The Commodification of Arthurian Legend, Elizabeth Sklar differentiated between exploitative and glib promotional Arthuriana, which uses the Arthur legends to sell things, and games like Knights of Camelot, an Arthurian product that "treats the legend seriously, even reverentially." She pointed out that the counters "include all major and many of the minor figures, both male and female, from the Morte d'Arthur, and for those that prove themselves sufficiently worthy, the game culminates in the Grail Quest."

== Awards ==
At the 1980 Charles S. Roberts Awards, Knights of Camelot was a finalist in two categories: Best Pre-Twentieth Century Game, and Best Fantasy or Science-Fiction Board Game.
