= The Zone (New Zealand TV channel) =

- Country: New Zealand

Programming
- Picture format: 1080i/576i (HDTV/SDTV)

Ownership
- Owner: SKY Network Television
- Sister channels: The Box Network; Vibe

History
- Launched: 1 November 2014; 12 years ago
- Closed: 1 July 2017; 9 years ago

Links
- Website: http://pages.skytv.co.nz/channels/the-zone

The Zone was a sci-fi, fantasy, horror and cult television channel on New Zealand's Sky Television on Channel 9.

The channel was announced in July 2014, and began to broadcast in November 2014. It was added at no additional cost to the basic subscription package.

The channel closed on 30 June 2017. It was replaced on Sky by a new channel, Sky Box Sets.
