= The Librarian: Curse of the Judas Chalice =

2008 American television film by Jonathan Frakes

- DVD cover
- Based on: Characters by David Titcher
- Written by: Marco Schnabel
- Directed by: Jonathan Frakes
- Starring: Noah Wyle; Bruce Davison; Stana Katic; Jane Curtin; Bob Newhart
- Theme music composer: Joseph LoDuca
- Country of origin: United States
- Original language: English

Production
- Producers: Noah Wyle; John Rogers
- Cinematography: David Connell
- Editor: David Siegel
- Running time: 95 minutes

Original release
- Network: TNT
- Release: December 7, 2008

Related
- The Librarian: Return to King Solomon's Mines; The Librarians

The Librarian: Curse of the Judas Chalice is a 2008 American television fantasy-adventure film and the third in The Librarian series starring Noah Wyle as Flynn Carsen, who protects a secret collection of magical artifacts from evildoers. In this installment, Flynn must keep the Judas Chalice out of the hands of ex-KGB agents seeking to resurrect Vlad Dracula, a legendary Romanian warlord-turned-vampire, and harness his vampiric powers for their gain. The television film was released on American cable channel TNT on December 7, 2008. It is a sequel to 2004's The Librarian: Quest for the Spear and 2006's The Librarian: Return to King Solomon's Mines.

== Plot ==
Librarian Flynn Carsen is in England bidding on a priceless Ming vase for the Library. He is simultaneously on the phone with Charlene, and his girlfriend, Katie, who is at the end of her rope. Frantic and distracted, he bids £1 million and loses Katie. He signs for the vase and promptly breaks it, revealing the philosopher's stone, which changes anything it touches into gold. Flynn deftly defends the stone and races to meet Katie, who has flown home.

Meanwhile, in Carpathia, a group of former KGB agents led by Sergei Kubichek plot to bring back the defunct Soviet Union by resurrecting the Wallachian prince-turned-vampire Vlad Dracula using the Judas Chalice. In Bucharest, they kidnap Professor Lazlo, a historian with a penchant for vampire lore who has sought the chalice for years. Lazlo joins them unwillingly and directs them to New Orleans.

Charlene drops by Flynn's apartment to give him travel brochures and advice: "Follow your dreams."Flynn's dreams point him to New Orleans. There, he meets Andrew, a guide. In a church-turned-nightclub, he encounters singer Simone Renoir, the woman in his dreams. She guards the first marker for locating the Chalice.

In the morning, Flynn has a magical encounter with Judson, who explains that the Chalice is the vampire version of the Holy Grail, formed from the thirty pieces of silver given to Judas Iscariot after he betrayed Jesus Christ. Judson tells Flynn to intercept the chalice and gives him crucial information about staking vampires: the stake must be of aspen wood because Judas, the first vampire, hanged himself on an aspen.

Flynn deciphers the clues on the first marker. Andrew takes him to the tomb of Marie Laveau, the "voodoo queen" of New Orleans, where he discovers the second marker, only to be grabbed by Kubichek's men. Flynn is poisoned with a hallucinogen, but escapes before the poison can take effect and deciphers a lens with a map inscribed on it. He is cornered by Kubichek's men, but is rescued by Simone, who demonstrates superhuman strength and the ability to transform into mist. Simone is shot in the chest, but recovers.

Simone is revealed to be a vampire who was born in Paris, France in 1603, and turned at age 25. She had been a promising opera singer, deeply in love with a university teacher, until a chance encounter with a vampire changed her. She wants to destroy her maker so she can die in peace. When she learned of the Chalice, she vowed to protect it and aid the monks who hid it in New Orleans. She has done so for two hundred years.

Andrew takes them into the bayou to the wrecked pirate ship and last resting place of Jean Lafitte and the chalice. They are again overtaken by Kubichek and his men, who leave Flynn and Simone trapped on board. Flynn uses a ship's cannon to blast down a door. Once free, Simone steals Andre's boat, abandoning Flynn. Hurt but determined, he makes his way back to the mainland and finds Kubichek's hideout.

Simone arrives at the same time, and they are captured. Kubichek performs the ceremony on a corpse, with no result. Laughing, Lazlo drinks from the chalice and transforms into his true form as Dracula, the vampire who turned Simone. He then turns Kubichek into a vampire. Kubichek's chief henchman Ivan sends Simone after them and destroys Kubichek, himself, and the hideout with a grenade. Flynn tricks Dracula into impaling himself on an aspen tree, which kills him. At peace, Simone asks Flynn to help her watch one last sunrise. They kiss goodbye, and she gently dissolves in a drift of sparkles. Flynn remembers Simone's words about living with purpose and passion and returns to the Library to resume his duties.

== Cast ==
- Noah Wyle as Flynn Carsen
- Bruce Davison as Professor Lazlo / Vlad Dracula
- Stana Katic as Simone Renoir
- Bob Newhart as Judson
- Jane Curtin as Charlene
- Dikran Tulaine as Sergei Kubichek
- Jason Douglas as Ivan
- Beth Burvant as Katie
- Werner Richmond as Andrew
- Stephen David Calhoun as Nicolai

== Reception ==
=== Ratings ===
The film averaged 5.44 million viewers over its two-hour run.

=== Critical response ===
Andrew L. Urban of Urban Cinefile gave it a positive review and wrote: "As soon as the opening credits begin, spurred on by Joseph LoDuca's 'adventure' score, we know we're in Indiana Jones territory but Indy has left the building, and the filmmakers have their tongues firmly in their cheeks."

== Awards ==
The film was nominated for three 2009 Emmy Awards, including Outstanding Supporting Actor in a Miniseries or a Movie (Bob Newhart).

== Production notes ==
Writer Marco Schnabel said that he does not think that bringing vampires into the story gave the film a different tone from the first two, noting that the horror elements were not too dark and that supernatural elements had always been a part of the franchise.
