= The Librarians (2014 TV series) =

American fantasy-adventure television series (2014–2018)

- Genre: Adventure; Fantasy
- Based on: The Librarian by David Titcher
- Developed by: John Rogers
- Showrunner: Dean Devlin
- Starring: Rebecca Romijn; Christian Kane; Lindy Booth; John Harlan Kim; John Larroquette
- Composer: Joseph LoDuca
- Country of origin: United States
- Original language: English
- No. of seasons: 4
- No. of episodes: 42 (list of episodes)

Production
- Executive producers: Dean Devlin; Marc Roskin; Noah Wyle; John Rogers
- Producers: Paul F. Bernard; Geoffrey Thorne
- Production location: Portland, Oregon
- Cinematography: David Connell
- Editors: Sonny Baskin; Jeremy Bertstein; Kate Rorick
- Running time: 42–58 minutes
- Production companies: Kung Fu Monkey Productions; Electric Entertainment

Original release
- Network: TNT
- Release: December 7, 2014 – February 7, 2018

Related
- The Librarian; The Librarians: The Next Chapter

The Librarians is an American fantasy adventure television series developed by John Rogers that premiered on TNT on December 7, 2014. The show is a direct spin-off of the Librarian film series, sharing continuity with the films. The Librarians are an ancient organization dedicated to protecting an innocent world from a magical and fantasy-like secret reality hidden from view. TNT cancelled the series in March 2018, days after the final episode of the fourth season. A spin-off called The Librarians: The Next Chapter premiered in May 2025.

== Plot ==
The series follows four people newly recruited by The Library: Colonel Eve Baird (Rebecca Romijn), of the NATO Anti-Terrorist Unit, destined to be the new Guardian; Ezekiel Jones (John Harlan Kim), a wisecracking master thief and hacker; Cassandra Cillian (Lindy Booth), a brilliant scientist and mathematician who possesses a trace of magic; and Jacob Stone (Christian Kane), a polymath who hides his knowledge of architecture, art, history, archaeology, language, and world cultures of the past and present behind the image of a typical Oklahoman oil rigger. The latter three received invitations from the Library at the same time as the current Librarian, Flynn Carsen (Noah Wyle), but for various reasons didn't show up for their interviews. Their lives are threatened in the first episode in the series. At the end of the second episode, the Library reissues their invitations.

In a break with the concept established in the films that there can be only one Librarian at a time, the first episodes reveal that the state of the world is so dire that it needs a team of Librarians, with Baird serving as Guardian of all four. With the help of Jenkins/Galahad (John Larroquette), immortal Knight of the Round Table-turned-manager of the Library's Annex, they solve impossible mysteries, rewrite and fix key moments in history, recover powerful magical artifacts, fight supernatural threats, and learn important things about themselves and each other. In the first season, they battle the forces of the Serpent Brotherhood, led by the mysterious immortal Dulaque (Matt Frewer). Carsen, who spends the first season searching for the main Library (removed from time and space at the beginning of the series) appears in some episodes.

The second season offers up a pair of new villains, both from fiction: Prospero (Richard Cox), from Shakespeare's The Tempest, and Moriarty (David S. Lee), Sherlock Holmes' chief nemesis. The former is positioned as the greater evil, attempting to use magic to destroy the world in order to remake it more to his liking. Moriarty is more of a gray villain—generally aligned with Prospero but willing to side with the Librarians when it suits his own interests.

The third season introduces a new adversary, Apep, the Egyptian God of Chaos. Defeated centuries before by the first Librarian, Judson (Bob Newhart), and his Guardian, Charlene (Jane Curtin), he is resurrected when his sarcophagus is opened and embarks on a mission to release pure evil into the world, possessing many different people along the way. While they are trying to stop Apep, the Librarians' actions are closely monitored by General Cynthia Rockwell (Vanessa Williams) from a new secret government agency, called DOSA (Department of Statistical Anomalies).

The fourth season does away with season-long story arcs in favor of stand-alone episodes, with three ongoing issues. One storyline builds on the season three revelation that the Library is a conscious entity; before the vernal equinox, Flynn and Eve must undertake a ceremony that will bind them to each other and to the Library, as Charlene and Judson did before them. They will become immortal and bind the Library to Earth, giving it a human connection and a human heart rather than the cold, implacable and dangerously self-centered attitude that would characterize it without that bond. The second storyline involves the return of Nicole Noone, Flynn's first Guardian; believed dead and now immortal, her presence raises many questions. The third storyline is the conflict that arises between the Librarians over former Librarian Darrington Dare's assertion that there can only be one Librarian at a time, or the result will be disastrous. All three stories are resolved in the last episode.

== Episodes ==
The first season concluded on January 18, 2015. On February 12, 2015, TNT renewed the series for a 10-episode second season, which aired from November 1 to December 27, 2015. On December 15, 2015, TNT renewed the series for a 10-episode third season, which aired from November 20, 2016, to January 22, 2017. On January 24, 2017, TNT renewed the series for a fourth season, which premiered on December 13, 2017.

| Season | Episodes | Originally released | |
| Season | Episodes | First released | Last released |
|---|---|---|---|
| 1 | 10 | December 7, 2014 | January 18, 2015 |
| 2 | 10 | November 1, 2015 | December 27, 2015 |
| 3 | 10 | November 20, 2016 | January 22, 2017 |
| 4 | 12 | December 13, 2017 | February 7, 2018 |

== Cast ==
=== Main ===
- Rebecca Romijn as Colonel Eve Baird, a former NATO agent whom the Library has chosen as its main "Guardian", tasked with protecting and training the new Librarians and protecting Flynn. In "And Santa's Midnight Run", it's revealed that she was born on Christmas Eve, and her parents named her accordingly. She and Flynn are attracted to each other almost immediately.
- Christian Kane as Jacob Stone, an Oklahoma oil-rigger and genius with an IQ of 190 and an extensive knowledge of languages, archaeology, Native-American culture, art history, conservation, architecture, and more. Fearing disapproval from his family, he has hidden his talents from them, publishing under several pseudonyms and winning worldwide recognition for his expertise. While he initially does not trust Cassandra after her betrayal in "And The Crown of King Arthur", he eventually accepts her as a valued member of the team.
- Lindy Booth as Cassandra Cillian, a mathematician who has uncontrollable auditory and sensory hallucinations linked to memory retrieval, as well as a rare condition called synesthesia. She has a brain tumor, diagnosed in childhood, which causes pain if she thinks hard enough. Because of the extreme pain, Stone teaches her to connect to a peaceful memory during her thoughts. Since her teens, she has been living with the knowledge that this tumor will kill her, unless she risks an extremely dangerous surgery that may take her life and, if she survives, will probably destroy her gift. Later, facing death, she has the surgery. The tumor is successfully removed, and she finds her mental abilities are tremendously enhanced, as is her connection with magic.
- John Harlan Kim as Ezekiel Jones, an Australian thief and "master of technologies". His credentials include hacking the London Police's security network, NSA, and numerous other law enforcement agencies. He prefers to rely on his luck and wit, not showing much concern for others until he gets to a point of realizing something important about the current case. In season 3, he reveals to his foster mother—but to no one else—that he does not keep his ill-gotten gains, but uses them to support charitable causes and to help the helpless. He believes that this is why the Library invited him.
- John Larroquette as Jenkins / Galahad, the Annex's reluctant, sometimes cantankerous caretaker; he is a skilled inventor who has worked there "for longer than anyone knows" and has extensive knowledge of ancient lore. He is also seen to have a connection to Dulaque, as revealed in "And the Apple of Discord". It is later explained that he is the immortal Knight of the Round Table Sir Galahad from King Arthur's Camelot, and Dulaque is Sir Lancelot du Lac (Lancelot's immortality is explained in The Librarians: The Next Chapter as a result of drawing on the power of his shield, though the cause of Galahad's immortality is unknown). He has also known Morgan le Fay (Alicia Witt) for centuries and considers her to be his archenemy, as he blames her for Arthur's death. In "And Some Dude Named Jeff", he confirms that he is Lancelot's illegitimate son.

=== Recurring ===
- Noah Wyle as Flynn Carsen, the main Librarian since the first film, who periodically works alongside the team. At the end of season four, he and Eve became the new immortal tethers for The Library after the previous tethers, Judson and Charlene, move on to the unknown.
- Matt Frewer as Dulaque (season 1), the mysterious immortal leader of the Serpent Brotherhood, who has a past relationship with Jenkins. In "And The Loom of Fate", he is revealed to be the immortal Knight of the Round Table Sir Lancelot du Lac and has devoted himself to reversing the events that brought about the fall of Camelot. In the same episode, he is briefly restored to his younger self (Jerry O'Connell), only to be erased from existence by Flynn now that he is mortal.
- Lesley-Ann Brandt as Lamia (season 1), Dulaque's second-in-command in the Serpent Brotherhood, who serves him faithfully until he betrays and kills her in "And The Loom of Fate". Her name is a reference to the mythical Libyan queen of the same name.
- Jane Curtin as Charlene (seasons 1 and 3), the Library's humorless administrator, who interviewed Flynn for the job of the Librarian. In the final season, it is revealed that she was the first Guardian and that she is immortal. She and Judson performed the tethering ceremony that is one of the season 4 story arcs.
- Bob Newhart as Judson (seasons 1 and 3), the first Librarian, who now acts as a mentor to those who take up the mantle. In the third season, it is revealed that he founded the Library in Alexandria during the time of Ancient Egypt after defeating Apep.
- Richard Cox as Prospero, the fictional protagonist of The Tempest (season 2), who comes to life seeking to regain his sorcery and conquer the world. During the finale of the second season, ("And The Final Curtain"), he merges with Shakespeare himself, only to be banished back to his original story by the Librarians.
- David S. Lee as Professor Moriarty (season 2), the archenemy of Sherlock Holmes, who is summoned by Prospero to assist him. He is eventually returned to his story by Prospero after betraying him in "And The Final Curtain".
- Hayley McLaughlin as Ariel (season 2), a real fairy (as opposed to a fictional) who was accidentally written into The Tempest by Shakespeare. She serves Prospero, using her powers to assist him and his followers. In "And The Happily Ever Afters", she manages to disguise herself as a human and contacts Flynn, helping him break her master's control over the other Librarians in exchange for her freedom.
- Beth Riesgraf as the Lady of the Lake (season 2), an enigmatic figure that acts as the spokesperson for an intellectual collective that truly comprehends the scientific constructs behind magic and takes an interest in Cassandra due to her unique abilities. In "And The Final Curtain", she helps Flynn and Eve defeat Prospero in the past by providing them with Arthur's sword, Excalibur.
- Vanessa Williams as Cynthia Rockwell (season 3), leader of the government agency, DOSA.
- Rachel Nichols as Nicole Noone (season 4), Flynn's first Guardian (portrayed in the first movie, The Librarian: Quest for the Spear, by Sonya Walger). Flynn thought that she had died, and he is shattered to find her alive and immortal in the present. Thrust 500 years into the past, she used magic to prolong her life and spent the next 5 centuries planning what to do when she saw Flynn again.

=== Guest ===
- Sean Astin as Kirby Goulding (season 3, "And the Tears of a Clown")
- René Auberjonois as a local librarian (season 1, "And the Fables of Doom")
- Bruce Campbell as Santa Claus (season 1, "And Santa's Midnight Run"), the legendary Christmas figure, who restores the goodwill he collects to the world each year at the time of the holiday
- Gia Carides as Lenore Jones (season 4, "And the Christmas Thief")
- Howard Charles as Ambrose Gethic (season 4, "And the Bleeding Crown")
- Felicia Day as Charlotte (season 3, "And the Tears of a Clown")
- John de Lancie as Mephistopheles (season 2, "And the Infernal Contract")
- Nora Dunn as Janet Hedge (season 4, "And a Town Called Feud")
- Jeff Fahey as Isaac Stone (season 2, "And What Lies Beneath the Stones"), Jake's father
- Michael Gladis as Frankenstein's monster (season 2, "And the Broken Staff")
- Tricia Helfer as Karen Willis (season 1, "And the Horns of a Dilemma")
- Jim Jefferies as British Santa (season 1, "And Santa's Midnight Run")
- Richard Kind as Bennie Konopka (season 4, "And the Steal of Fortune")
- Eric Allan Kramer as Olafsson (season 3, "And the Reunion of Evil"), a Jötunn
- Sunny Mabrey as Fortuna (season 4, "And the Steal of Fortune")
- Tyler Mane as the Minotaur (season 1, "And the Horns of a Dilemma")
- John Noble as Monsignor Vega (season 4, "And the Dark Secret")
- Jerry O'Connell as young Lancelot (season 1, "And the Loom of Fate")
- Drew Powell as Ray / the Library (season 2, "And the Hollow Men"), the spirit of the Library in human form
- Ernie Reyes Jr. as the Monkey King (season 3, "And the Fatal Separation")
- Samuel Roukin as Darrington Dare (season 4, "And the Bleeding Crown")
- Bex Taylor-Klaus as Amy Meyer (season 1, "And the Rule of Three")
- Michael Trucco as Sam Denning (season 2, "And the Infernal Contract")
- Haley Webb as Mabel Collins (season 1, "And the City of Light")
- Steven Weber as the Saint of Thieves (season 4, "And the Christmas Thief")

== Production ==
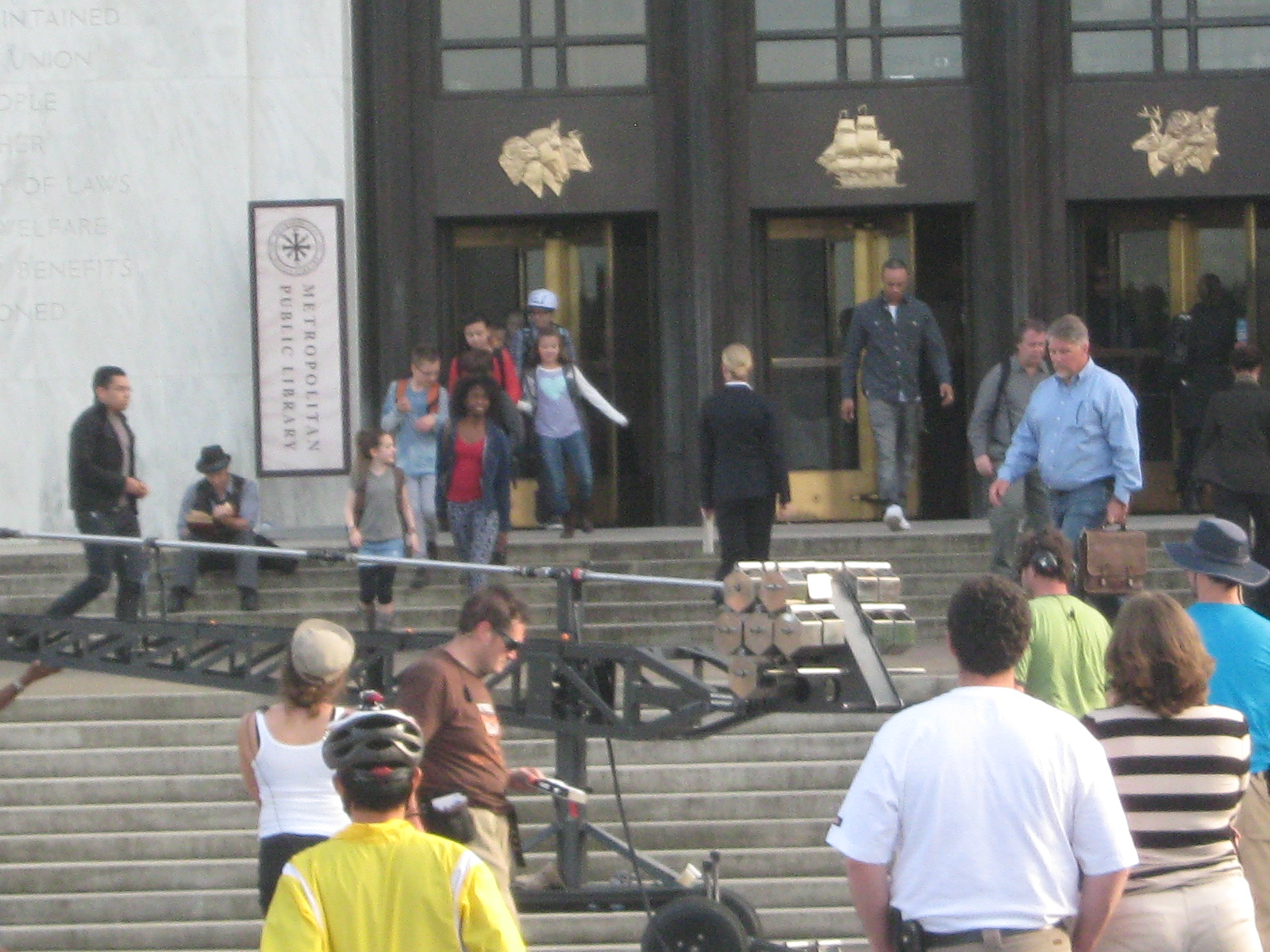
A scene for The Librarians being filmed at the Oregon State Capitol in Salem.

TNT ordered a ten-episode weekly series version of The Librarians, following the original cast that includes Noah Wyle, Bob Newhart, and Jane Curtin, as well as five new characters who work for The Library. The series filmed in Portland, Oregon. Some scenes were filmed at the Oregon State Capitol in Salem. A teaser trailer aired right after the Falling Skies season finale.

On March 8, 2018, Dean Devlin announced that TNT had cancelled the series and that he was in the process of shopping the series to other networks; however, in June, Devlin announced that negotiations were unsuccessful.

== Broadcast ==
The series premiered in over 100 countries on Universal Channel within 24 hours of its premiere in the United States. In Canada, the series premiered December 7, 2014, on Space. In the United Kingdom, the series was originally set to premiere on Universal Channel, however, it was announced it would instead air on Syfy, premiering December 8, 2014. In Australia, the series premiered on Universal Channel on December 9, 2014, and returned for season 2 on November 5, 2015. The series premiered in New Zealand on The Zone on February 17, 2015.

=== Home media ===
In Australia, Region 4, the entire series has been released on DVD individually and as a complete series box set.

- The Complete First Season — 13 May 2015
- The Complete Second Season — 23 March 2016
- The Complete Third Season — 15 March 2017
- The Complete Fourth Season — 18 April 2018
- The Complete Series — 6 March 2019

=== Syndication ===
The first two episodes also appeared as a feature film on December 12, 2014, on The CW. The show was acquired by UPtv and premiered on March 13, 2019. The show moved to Ovation in 2019.

== Novels ==
Three tie-in novels have been published, all written by Greg Cox: The Librarians and the Lost Lamp (2016) follows the characters of the television series as they attempt to find Aladdin's lamp, in both the past and the future. In The Librarians and the Mother Goose Chase (2017), the characters attempt to find various sections of the original Mother Goose story book before a descendant of the original Mother Goose is able to recombine the parts and use its power. In The Librarians and the Pot of Gold (2019), the Serpent Brotherhood have returned, and the Librarians learn the truth behind the story of St. Patrick driving the "snakes" out of Éire, with the help of a Librarian.

- Cox, Greg (October 11, 2016). The Librarians and The Lost Lamp. New York. ISBN 9780765384089.
- ———— (April 25, 2017). The Librarians and the Mother Goose Chase. New York. ISBN 9780765384140.
- ———— (October 30, 2018). The Librarians and the Pot of Gold. New York. ISBN 9780765384126.

== Reception ==
=== Critical reception ===
The review aggregator website Rotten Tomatoes lists the show as The Quest (2014-2018). As of May 2025, it reports an 89% rating for the entire run of the series, based on 20 out of 24 reviews. The Oregonian reviewed the premiere of the final season with high praise, noting, “It’s good to have “The Librarians” back in action. In an age when pop culture is hooked on superheroes, it's especially comforting to see the Librarians team saving the day not with their bulging muscles or futuristic gizmos, but with their fact-filled, enlightened brains.“

Metacritic uses a weighted average and only reviewed the first season, giving it a score of 63 out of 100 based on 11 reviews, indicating "generally favorable reviews".

=== Accolades ===
| Year | Award | Category | Recipient | Result | Ref. |
|---|---|---|---|---|---|
| 2018 | 44th Saturn Awards | Best Fantasy Television Series | The Librarians | Nominated | |
| 2018 | 44th Saturn Awards | Best Supporting Actor on Television | Christian Kane | Nominated | |
| 2018 | 44th Saturn Awards | Best Guest Performance in a Television Series | Rachel Nichols | Nominated | |

== Spin-off ==
In May 2023, The CW (a former sibling to TNT) announced that it had ordered a spin-off, The Librarians: The Next Chapter; it will follow a team led by a Librarian from the past (Callum McGowan) who had become stuck in the present day, and accidentally released magic across the continent whilst visiting his castle—which had since become a museum.

It was scheduled to premiere on October 25, 2024, but was unexpectedly pulled from The CW's fall lineup in August 2024. On August 23, 2024, TNT revealed that it had acquired The Next Chapter as part of an agreement with The CW, and also ordered a second season. The CW established a new subsidiary known as CW Studios to maintain an ownership stake in the series as a co-production, giving the network an in-house studio for the first time since its sale to Nexstar Media Group (who ended its long-term associations with CBS Studios and Warner Bros. Television). The spin-off has premiered by TNT on May 25, 2025.
