= The Librarian: Quest for the Spear =

2004 American television film by Peter Winther

- Genre: Fantasy; Adventure
- Written by: David Titcher
- Directed by: Peter Winther
- Starring: Noah Wyle; Kyle MacLachlan; Sonya Walger; Jane Curtin; Olympia Dukakis
- Composer: Joseph LoDuca
- Original language: English

Production
- Producers: Jörg Westerkamp; Kai Schürmann; Phillip M. Goldfarb
- Cinematography: Alan Caso
- Editor: Ron Rosen
- Running time: 90 minutes (Blu-ray); 106 minutes (DVD)
- Production company: Electric Entertainment

Original release
- Network: TNT
- Release: December 5, 2004

Related
- The Librarian franchise

The Librarian: Quest for the Spear is a 2004 American made-for-television fantasy-adventure film and the first in the Librarian franchise of films and television series. It was originally released on American cable channel TNT on December 5, 2004, written by David Titcher, directed by Peter Winther and starring Noah Wyle as Flynn Carsen: a perpetual student who unknowingly gets a job safeguarding artifacts of untold power in the Library, an alternate dimension below the surface of the New York City Metropolitan Public Library, and embarks on a globe-trotting mission to retrieve and reassemble the Spear of Destiny before an evil cult can.

== Plot ==
Flynn Carsen, a perpetual college student in his 30s with 22 academic degrees, is kicked out of college by Professor Harris, who arranges for Flynn to get his 23rd degree mid-term. They have just completed a 1/20th scale model of the great pyramid, complete with a gold capstone. He and Flynn's mother, Margie, tell him that he lacks real-life experience and needs to experience life outside of college.

Flynn receives an invitation to a librarian job at the Metropolitan Public Library, where he is told that the position of "Librarian" has actually existed for thousands of years. His role is to protect historical and often magical items stored in a secret alternate dimension known simply as the Library and located far below the city library, including Pandora's Box, Tesla's Death Ray, the Holy Grail, the transmuted corpse of King Midas, and Excalibur, which is sentient and fiercely protective of the other artifacts. Judson, the head of the Library, informs him that one of three parts of the Spear of Destiny is stolen by a cult known as the Serpent Brotherhood. Flynn has been chosen to track down the remaining two pieces. He is sent to the Amazon rainforest, entrusted with a book written in the untranslated "Language of the birds.”

On the plane, Flynn is ambushed by members of the Serpent Brotherhood and is rescued by a woman who forces him out of the plane in mid-air. Once they land, he finds that his rescuer, Nicole Noone, has been sent by Judson as his Guardian. She fell in love with Edward Wilde, the previous Librarian, and blames herself for his death. She resists any friendly feelings for Flynn. Together, they encounter waterfalls, a friendly local tribe, bridge collapses, and Maya death traps, which they survive with little difficulty thanks to Flynn's extensive knowledge and Nicole's physical prowess. They retrieve the second piece of the spear and are immediately captured by the brotherhood and Wilde, their leader, who had faked his death. Wilde almost shoots Nicole when Flynn steps in front of her and agrees to find the last piece of the spear in exchange for Nicole's life.

At Shangri-La, they learn that their arrival has been prophesied. Solving one more riddle, Flynn retrieves the last spear piece, the blade, and the temple starts to collapse. The monks battle the Serpent Brotherhood and Flynn and Nicole escape in a helicopter. After they spend the night at a hotel, Flynn wakes up the next morning to find Nicole, the spear blade and his clothes missing. Judson contacts him through a TV in the hotel lobby, and when he describes the conditions necessary to join the spear parts together—a golden-cap-stoned pyramid, augmented by a powerful electromagnetic field during a full moon—Flynn realizes that Professor Harris is in on the scheme.

Judson meets him outside the university building where the pyramid was reconstructed. They watch as the Serpent Brothers, including Harris, assemble to watch Wilde call down the ancient powers and fuse the spear into one. Nicole is their prisoner. After Judson defeats a henchman, he reveals he was also a Librarian. Wilde stabs one of his men, absorbing his life force through the spear. Flynn frees Nicole before Wilde can stab her. Nicole and Judson take on the Brotherhood while Flynn follows Wilde, who tries to kill him. When the spear strikes stone, the Pyramid shakes. Flynn leads Wilde to damage the support stones, upsetting the precariously balanced structure. The capstone then falls onto Wilde, killing him. Flynn reclaims the spear, which avoided being crushed on its own, in the name of the Library, where it is displayed near Excalibur, which Flynn finally draws from its stone. Judson and Charlene show him the latest portrait in the gallery of Librarians: Flynn, holding the Spear.

Three months later, Flynn is at a café with Margie when Nicole arrives, informing him that the 'Deadly Scorpion League' has got their hands on a time machine.

== Cast ==
- Noah Wyle as Flynn Carsen
- Sonya Walger as Nicole Noone
- Bob Newhart as Judson
- Jane Curtin as Charlene
- Olympia Dukakis as Margie Carsen
- Kyle MacLachlan as Edward Wilde
- Kelly Hu as Lana
- David Dayan Fisher as Rhodes

== Production ==
In May 2003, it was announced TNT and Dean Devlin's Electric Entertainment would team up to produce action-adventure TV film The Librarian, about a student who is thrown into a world he didn’t expect when he answers a classified ad to be the librarian at the New York Public Library, which turns out to be the repository of mankind’s most secret and valuable artifacts. In May 2004, it was announced Noah Wyle would play the title character.

== Reception ==
On Rotten Tomatoes it has an approval rating of 60% based on reviews from 5 critics.

David Cornelius at eFilmCritic.com gave it a positive review: "It's a fun cheesy cable TV flick, a slice of winking B movie giddiness that charms us into smiling through all the nonsense."

== Awards ==
Nominated for the 2006 Writers Guild Award for Outstanding Achievement in Writing for a Long Form (Original) (David Titcher) by the Writers Guild of America.

== DVD ==
An unrated, Region 1 NTSC DVD was released for this film on August 30, 2005, using an aspect ratio of 1.78:1.

== Sequels ==
A sequel, The Librarian: Return to King Solomon's Mines, aired on TNT on December 3, 2006. It was released on DVD in December 19. The second sequel, The Librarian: Curse of the Judas Chalice, was released on December 7, 2008. A one-hour TV series, The Librarians, premiered on TNT on December 7, 2014, with a ten-episode season. It ran for a total of four seasons. A second television series, The Librarians: The Next Chapter, premiered on May 25, 2025.

The character Nicole Noone does not appear in the other films. Her fate is explored in the TV series season 4, where she is portrayed by Rachel Nichols.
