= The Librarian: Return to King Solomon's Mines =

2006 American television film by Jonathan Frakes

- Based on: Characters created by David Titcher
- Screenplay by: Marco Schnabel
- Directed by: Jonathan Frakes
- Starring: Noah Wyle; Gabrielle Anwar; Jane Curtin; Robert Foxworth; Olympia Dukakis; Bob Newhart
- Theme music composer: Joseph LoDuca
- Country of origin: United States
- Original language: English

Production
- Producers: Noah Wyle; Michael S. Murphey
- Cinematography: Walt Lloyd
- Editor: David Siegel
- Running time: 95 minutes

Original release
- Network: TNT
- Release: December 3, 2006

Related
- The Librarian: Quest for the Spear; The Librarian: Curse of the Judas Chalice

The Librarian: Return to King Solomon's Mines is a 2006 American made-for-television fantasy-adventure film and the second in The Librarian franchise of movies starring Noah Wyle as a librarian who protects a secret collection of artifacts. The television film was released on American cable channel TNT on December 3, 2006. Gabrielle Anwar, Bob Newhart, Jane Curtin and Olympia Dukakis co-star. It is a sequel to 2004's The Librarian: Quest for the Spear. The third film in the trilogy, The Librarian: Curse of the Judas Chalice, was released in 2008.

== Plot ==
Flynn Carsen has served as the Librarian for a year. On his latest mission, he almost fails to retrieve a crystal skull by holding on to another find. Judson, his mentor, tells him that a Librarian must sacrifice their own interests for the greater good.

Flynn encounters "Uncle" Jerry, an old family friend, at his birthday party. Flynn's mother Margie gives her son childhood pictures she drew to illustrate his father's bedtime stories, plus his father's amulet. Flynn finds his apartment ransacked; he is ambushed and robbed of a scroll he received containing clues to the location of King Solomon's Mines. Judson tells him that the Key of Solomon, a book hidden in the mines, will give the reader of it control over time and space.

Searching Roman ruins in Morocco, Flynn meets Emily Davenport, an archaeologist who holds more degrees than he does. Flynn and Emily are attacked after they find a piece to the map legend, but their assailant becomes an ally when Flynn's amulet lights up, identifying him as one of the order of the Cryptic Masons. The man tells them where to find the rest of the map legend. Emily recognizes the markings as the Akon cipher and insists on coming with Flynn to Kenya. The sinister General Samir, seeking the mines himself, extracts Flynn's destination from the man who helped him escape.

Traveling through the Serengeti, Flynn and Emily come upon Jomo, a man buried up to his neck in sand for stealing. Once freed, Jomo insists on being their guide. On a rest break, Flynn shows Emily his childhood drawings. Emily confides to Flynn her obsession since childhood with the mysterious Queen of Sheba,. He tells her how his father was shot dead by a mugger. They finally reach a village and recognize a local fortune teller's sign as a clue. Just as Flynn finds the other piece of the map legend, Emily helps him escape Samir's men.

Flynn and Emily run into Jerry, boarding a train for Mombasa. He tells Flynn that his father's amulet has been passed down through many generations. After dinner, Emily and Flynn discover the magical musical key to the map based on the Song of Solomon. Despite Judson's orders to return, they travel to Three Witches Mountain near Mombasa; the terrain reminds Flynn of his drawings. With Samir in pursuit, they penetrate the caves and discover a vast cache of treasure.

As Flynn finds the Key on a pedestal and opens it, Samir drags in a disheveled Jerry and beats him. Flynn tosses Samir the book, but Jerry reveals that he shot Flynn's father because he refused to disclose the secret of the mine, and Samir is working for him. Jerry wants to turn back time and win Margie for himself. He enters a chamber lined with niches where dead kings lie, with a bubbling lava pit below, and reads aloud an incantation, stirring up ghosts as he does so. Flynn and Emily are flung into a pit that fills with water. Flynn comes close to drowning and experiences a vision of Judson on a white beach, then finds that he and Emily are being rescued by Jomo, seeking to fulfill his debt to them. Emily throws oil on Samir and it catches fire from the lighter he is holding, and he is subsequently killed by vampire bats.

Flynn wrestles the book from Jerry, leaving the incantation unfinished. As he is about to throw the book into the lava pit, Jerry tempts him with the opportunity to bring his father back. Emily and Jomo burst into the cave to find Flynn uttering the incantation. Emily uses a spear to reflect light on Flynn's amulet, breaking the spell. When Flynn throws the book into the lava pit, Jerry leaps after it to his death. Flynn, Emily, and Jomo flee as the cave crumbles and explodes. Flynn consigns the amulet and guardianship to Jomo. Emily pursues her search for the Queen of Sheba in Tunisia.

Flynn returns to the Library and tells Judson that he sacrificed the book for the greater good, to Judson's approval. When asked if he were consciously in Flynn's vision, Judson mentions a detail that Flynn deliberately left out, confirming his presence to be true.

== Cast ==
- Noah Wyle as Flynn Carsen
- Gabrielle Anwar as Emily Davenport
- Bob Newhart as Judson
- Jane Curtin as Charlene
- Olympia Dukakis as Margie Carsen
- Robert Foxworth as "Uncle" Jerry
- Erick Avari as General Samir
- Hakeem Kae-Kazim as Jomo

== Reception ==
On Rotten Tomatoes the film has four reviews listed, two are positive, and two are negative.

David Cornelius of DVDTalk.com gave the film a rating of 3.5 out 5, and wrote: "These movies are unabashedly fun, a breezy cocktail of dopey action and broad laughs."

== Awards ==
The film won Best Presentation on Television category at the 33rd Saturn Awards.
