= Sonia Romero =

American artist (born 1980)

- Born: 1980 (age 45–46); Los Angeles, California, US
- Education: Rhode Island School of Design
- Known for: Chicana art, Los Angeles art
- Notable work: Macarthur Park Metro Station, "Urban Oasis", 2010
- Style: printmaking, murals
- Children: 2
- Parents: Frank Romero (father); Nancy Wyle Romero (mother)
- Relatives: Edith R. Wyle (maternal grandmother); Noah Wyle (cousin); David A. Romero (cousin)
- Website: www.soniaromero.net

Sonia Amalia Romero (born 1980 in Los Angeles, California) is an American artist, she is known for her printmaking, mixed media linocut prints, murals, and public art based in Los Angeles. She is known for depicting Los Angeles, Latin American imagery, and Chicano themes in her work.

Romero has had artwork commissioned by the Los Angeles County Art Commission, and the Los Angeles County Metropolitan Transportation Authority. She is known for straddling the world of both fine art and public art, as her prints are often exhibited in galleries and she collaborates with civic organizations in producing public art, such as the public pool murals created with the Los Angeles Conservation Corp.

== Biography ==
Sonia Romero was born in 1980 in Los Angeles, California. Her parents are artists, Nancy (née Wyle) and Frank Romero, and she is the granddaughter of Frank S. Wyle and Edith R. Wyle, founders of the Craft and Folk Art Museum and Wyle Laboratories. She is of Russian–Jewish descent on her mother's side and Mexican and Spanish descent on her father's side.

Romero is a graduate of the Los Angeles County High School for the Arts, and she received a Bachelor of Fine Arts degree from the Rhode Island School of Design (RISD) in 2002, where she studied printmaking. Her first solo show was in September 2006 at the Avenue 50 Studio, where she exhibited paintings, prints and mixed media especially block printing. Since then, she has been highly recognizable for her public artwork, such as the mosaic print installation at the MacArthur Park Metro Station.

From 2007 until 2014, she was artist-in-residence at Avenue 50 Studio in Highland Park.

Her work is included in the permanent collection at the McNay Art Museum in San Antonio, Texas.

== Art ==
Romero's work is known for its clear crisp lines, use of iconography, and reflection of life in Los Angeles. Much of Romero's work is made in Los Angeles, embedded in, and reflects the city. She has stated in interviews that as a student she was drawn to printmaking because of its potential for mass communication, through the built-in ability for multiplying designs. Her work is considered part of the serigraph tradition. Her work integrates symbols associated with Chicano, Latino, and Hispanic cultures, but often also addresses contemporary issues. For instance, her 2014 piece, Bee Pile, included in the Estampas de la Raza exhibit at the North Carolina Museum of Art, brought together iconography from her ethnic background with mediations of honey bees to draw attention to Colony Collapse Disorder.

Dambrot of KCET, describes Romero's latest ongoing print series, "Revolving Landscape" as:

...the story of her whole life and career -- a story of a diversity of intertwined and overlapping influences, from her parents (both painters) to her neighborhood (North East LA) to her education (Rhode Island School of Design) that have each left indelible marks on who she is and what she is about. And that is, the fusion of those influences into a deeply personal, deliberately accessible modern traditionalism, expressing itself in the romantic, thorny, fabulist urban storytelling that has made her one of the brightest rising stars in the local visual-culture firmament.

— Shana Nys Dambrot, "Sonia Romero: From her Print Studio in North East LA, an Artist Depicts and Adorns her Imagination and the Public Life of a City"

Romero is also considered a favorite artist among the "indie art" community, with a popular Etsy store, She Rides the Lion (named after her studio), where she previously sold her prints.

== Notable works ==
A select list of notable work by Romero, listed by ascending date.

- Lady Artesia, 2017, ceramic tile mural, located at Artesia Library, Artesia, California
- They Fly Through the Water, 2014, located at Belvedere Pool, East Los Angeles, California
- Bee Pile, 2014, this was a site specific installation located at Figueroa Produce, Highland Park, Los Angeles, California
- Fall, 2012, collagraph print
- Inner Landscape, 2011, silk screen, The Buck Collection at UCI Jack and Shanaz Langson Institute and Museum of California Art, University of California, Irvine (UCI)
  - Sonia Romero studied yoga and meditation which influenced her to create this self portrait. This work portrays the transition from looking at outwardly sources for inspiration into looking inside yourself for inspiration. By closing your eyes, you are able to find information in your body that you can find in the outside world.
- Urban Oasis, 2010, ceramic tile mural, located at MacArthur Park Metro Station, Los Angeles, California
- The Water Cycle: Eternal Flow / El Ciclo Del Agua: Eterno Manantial, 2008, City Terrace Park Pool, Los Angeles, California

== Exhibitions ==
A select list of exhibitions.

- 2022 – Dissolve, UCI Jack and Shanaz Langson Institute and Museum of California Art, University of California, Irvine (UCI) University Art Gallery (UAG), Irvine, California
- 2020 – 2021 – ¡Printing the Revolution! The Rise and Impact of Chicano Graphics, 1965 to Now, group exhibition, Smithsonian American Art Museum, Washington, D.C.
- 2017 – Día De los Muertos, A Cultural Legacy, Past Presents and Future, a PST LA/LA exhibit, group exhibition, Self Help Graphics, Los Angeles, California
- 2014 – Women that Byte, group exhibition, Southern Graphics Council International Conference, Mission Cultural Center for Latino Arts (MCCLA), San Francisco, California
- 2014 – Chicano Dream – Chicano Artists from the Cheech Marin Collection (1980–2010), group exhibition, Musée d'Aquitaine, Bordeaux, France
- 2012 – 2015 – Estampas de la Raza: Contemporary Prints from the Romo Collection (a traveling group exhibition), McNay Art Museum, Albuquerque Museum of Art and History, Vincent Price Art Museum, National Museum of Mexican Art, North Carolina Museum of Art
- 2011 – Inner Landscape, Round Trip: Eight East Los Angeles College Alumni Artists, group exhibition, Vincent Price Art Museum, Monterey Park, California
