= David Romero =

David Romero may refer to:

- David Romero Ellner (died 2020), Honduran journalist
- David Romero (pentathlete) (1929–2011), Mexican pentathlete
- David A. Romero (born 1984), Mexican-American spoken word artist, poet and activist
- David Romero (footballer) (born 2003), Argentine footballer
