= Chris Francis =

American artist (born 1976)

Chris Francis (born 1976, Kokomo, Indiana) is an American artist, living and working in Los Angeles. Beginning as an artist and carpenter, Francis eventually started creating leather wear worn by Mötley Crüe's Mick Mars, Steve Jones of the Sex Pistols, and former Runaways guitarist Lita Ford. Francis gained acclaim as a high-concept shoe designer creating wearable art.

== Education ==
Francis attended the Maryland Institute College of Art for over a year but did not complete the program. He traveled the United States on freight trains for five years and worked as a tree topper, street-side shoe shiner, worked on fishing ships, washed windows, worked on film sets, and finally was a carpenter.

Francis is a self-taught shoe designer and began creating wearable art in 2011 after seeing a guest shoemaker hand stitch shoes at a Louis Vuitton event in Los Angeles. Without a proper leather sewing machine Francis did all the work by hand, and in the beginning he did not have proper shoe lasts, so he carved them himself in a park. He picked up shoe making tools from other shoemakers in the Hollywood area.

== Art ==
Francis creates shoes as an artist, finding inspiration in his favorite books, architecture, music, vintage machines, and flea market finds.

Francis cites architects Walter Gropius, Mies van der Rohe, Terry de Havilland, and artist Josef Albers as his inspiration.

== Selected works ==
For his exhibition at the Craft and Folk Art Museum, Chris Francis: Shoe Designer, his entire studio was transported to the storefront of the museum, taking residency for the remaining show.
