= Shannan Moynihan =

American physician

- Education: Massachusetts Institute of Technology; New York University; University of Florida
- Scientific career
- Workplaces: Johnson Space Center

Shannan Moynihan is the Deputy Chief of Space and Occupational Medicine at the Johnson Space Center. She has acted as crew surgeon for International Space Station missions.

== Education and early career ==
As a child, Moynihan wanted to become an astronaut. She studied aeronautical engineering at Massachusetts Institute of Technology. She studied medicine at New York University and graduated in 1999. She completed a residency in emergency medicine at the University of Florida. She completed a Masters in public health and aerospace medicine in Houston.

== Career ==
Moynihan worked as a flight surgeon at the University of Texas Medical Branch Wyle Laboratories. She was part of the Medical Operations team for the C-9 Familiarization Flight. She joined NASA in 2008. She manages the medical care for the occupants of interplanetary spacecraft. Around this time, Moynihan noticed that long duration astronauts were coming back with distinct visual changes. She has since been studying Spaceflight-Associated Neuro-Ocular Syndrome, and sent an optical coherence tomography scanner up to the ISS.

She was part of the NASA twins study, monitoring astronaut Scott Kelly and his brother Mark Kelly. In 2016 she published practical considerations that must be taken for women astronauts on the International Space Station. She is concerned about reproductive viability, bone health, menopausal status and nutrition. Moynihan relies on telemedicine to provide health care to astronauts on board the International Space Station. The astronauts use a colour-coded ultrasound machine and make calls to Moynihan using a VoIP phone. During a sixth-month mission, one of the astronauts, who suffered with a history of knee injury, developed a persistent pain. This was assessed using ultrasound, where images were live streamed back to the planet Earth.

She took part in the BBC documentary Women with the Right Stuff and the book Promised the Moon. She appeared in the Channel 4 documentary, Live from Space. She is affiliated with San Jacinto Methodist Hospital.
