= Edith R. Wyle =

American painter (1918–1999)

Edith Robinson Wyle
- Born: Edith Robinson; April 21, 1918; San Francisco, California
- Died: October 12, 1999 (aged 81)
- Known for: Co-founder of the Craft and Folk Art Museum
- Spouse: Frank S. Wyle
- Relatives: Sonia Romero (granddaughter); Noah Wyle (grandson)

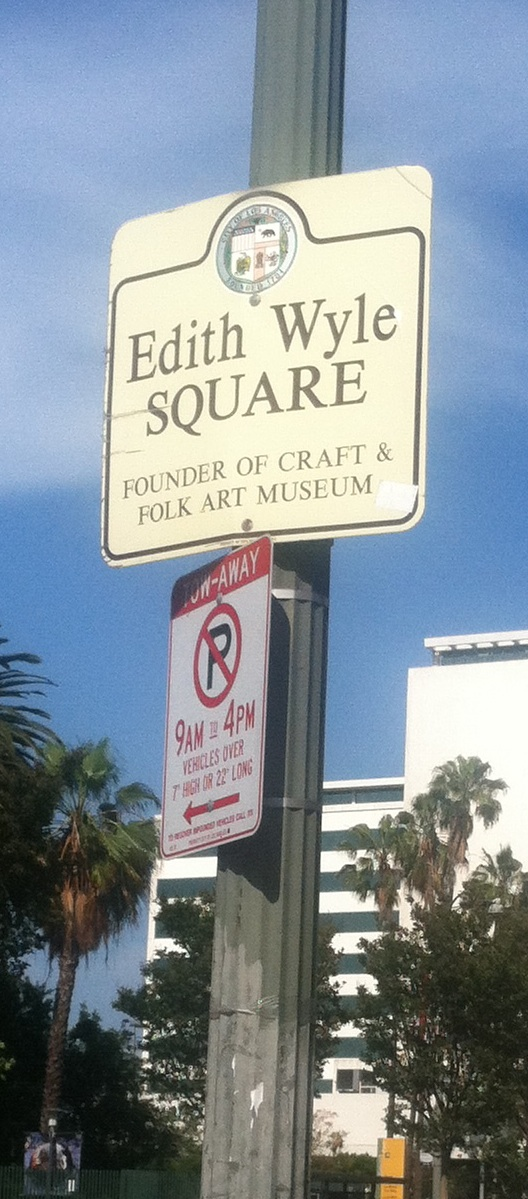
Signage for Edith Wyle Square, on Wilshire Avenue in Los Angeles, California, USA.

Edith Robinson Wyle (April 21, 1918 – October 12, 1999) was an American artist and arts patron, founder of the Craft and Folk Art Museum in Los Angeles.

== Early life and education ==
Edith Robinson was born in San Francisco in 1918, the daughter of Rosalia (née Robinovitch) and Louis Robinson. Her grandparents were all Jewish emigrants from Russia. She was named after her maternal grandmother, Edith Robinovitch. Her paternal grandparents, Anna and Samuel Rovinsky, changed their surname to Robinson at Ellis Island.

Wyle's parents were professional musicians, but her father also trained as a dentist. Her father was a member of the Persinger String Quartet and the San Francisco Symphony Orchestra, and later worked for Hollywood studios, primarily under Alfred Newman. He conducted the orchestra for the score of Under Suspicion (1930) and was part of the orchestra for Modern Times (1936).

Edith moved to Los Angeles with her parents when she was six years old. As a girl she studied art, music, and dance. She earned a degree in English at the University of California Los Angeles (UCLA), and worked as a secretary before she married.

As a young wife and mother in the 1940s, Edith Wyle returned to painting, and studied with the painter and sculptor Rico Lebrun, who encouraged her particular interest in folk arts. Through adulthood she continued to take classes in various media, including weaving and pottery.

== Career ==
In 1965, Edith Wyle opened The Egg and the Eye, a commercial gallery and café on Wilshire Boulevard, across from the La Brea Tar Pits and the Los Angeles County Museum of Art (LACMA). Describing the gallery's founding, she told the Los Angeles Times:

I'd always had this wild notion of wanting to walk through a tapestry gallery and eat a good lunch. And I could cook only omelettes. Presto ... The Egg and the Eye. I think it is the best thing that could happen to a woman whose kids are grown.

In 1973, the gallery and cafe became the Craft and Folk Art Museum (and the café took on the name of the gallery, The Egg and The Eye). Wyle was program director of the museum until 1984 when she retired, taking the title of Founder/Director Emeritus and going on the Board. Wyle refused to allow a merger with LACMA in 1997 and, always struggling financially, the museum closed for 14 months. She lived to see the museum reopened under the auspices of the Los Angeles Cultural Affairs Department.

In connection with her museum work, Edith Wyle conceived of the Festival of Masks in 1976, a multicultural parade and arts celebration. Wyle also worked on arts events during the 1984 Summer Olympics, and served on the board at California Institute of the Arts (CalArts). She was the author of several exhibition catalogs.

== Personal life ==
Edith Robinson married Frank S. Wyle in 1942. They had three children together: Nancy Wyle Romero (mother of artist Sonia Romero), Stephen Wyle (father of actor Noah Wyle), and Diana Munk.

== Death and legacy ==
Edith Wyle died from cancer in October 1999, age 81.

The Edith R. Wyle Research Library of the Craft and Folk Art Museum, now housed at LACMA, was named in her honor in 1995.
