= Noah Wyle =

American actor (born 1971)

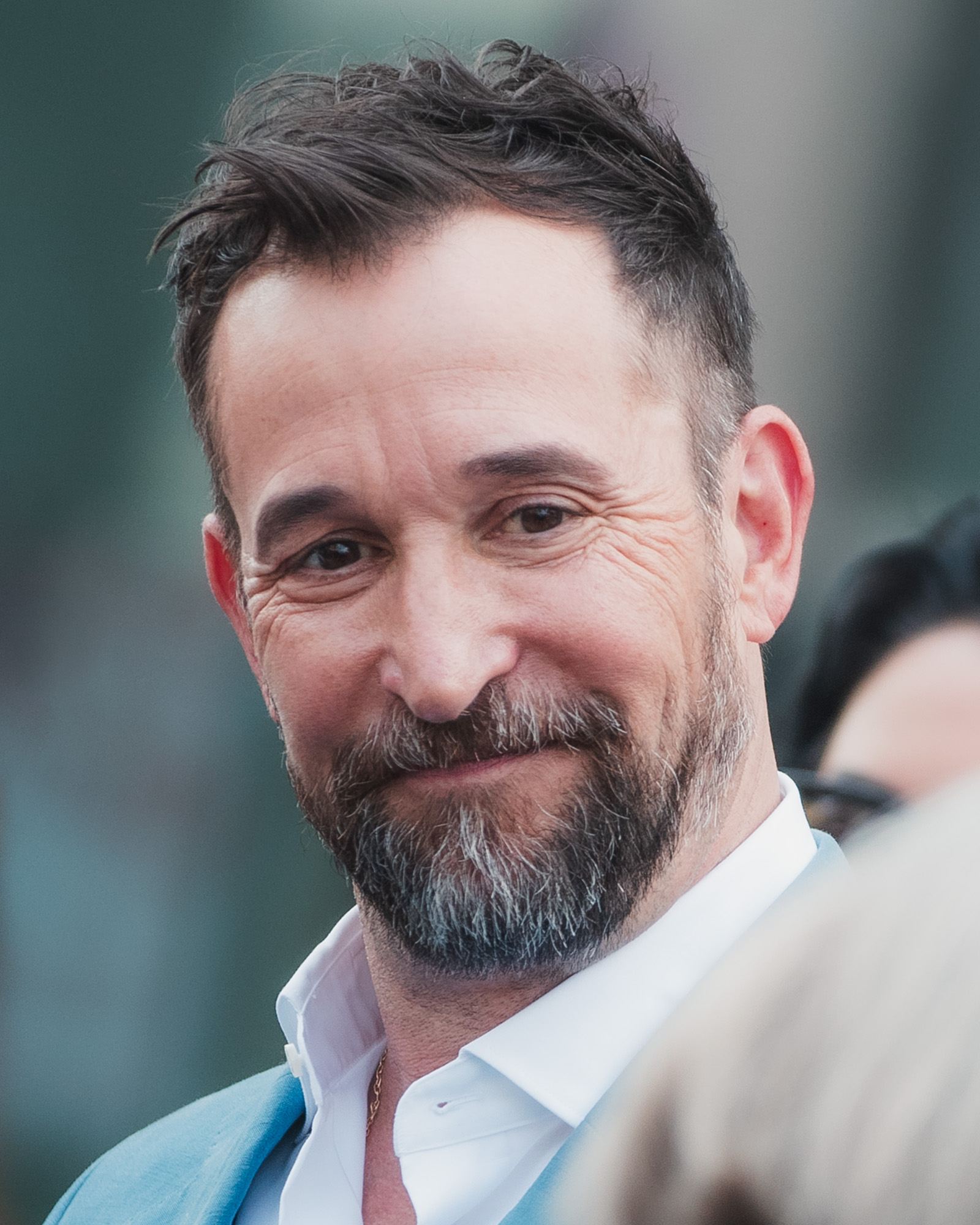
- Wyle in 2026
- Born: Noah Strausser Speer Wyle; June 4, 1971 (age 55); Los Angeles, California, U.S.
- Occupations: Actor; director; producer; writer
- Years active: 1985–present
- Spouses: Tracy Warbin (m. 2000; div. 2010) Sara Wells (m. 2014)
- Children: 3
- Relatives: Edith R. Wyle (paternal grandmother); Frank Wyle (paternal grandfather); John Sturges (step-maternal grandfather); James C. Katz (stepfather); Sonia Romero (cousin)

Noah Strausser Speer Wyle (/ˈwaɪli/; born June 4, 1971) is an American actor, television director, producer and writer. He is best known for portraying Dr. John Carter in the NBC medical drama ER (1994–2005) and Dr. Michael "Robby" Robinavitch in the HBO Max medical drama The Pitt (2025–present). These performances earned him six Actor Awards, a Golden Globe Award and four Primetime Emmy Awards. He was named as People's Sexiest Man Alive in 2026.

Wyle is also known for his work on TNT, portraying Steve Jobs in the television film Pirates of Silicon Valley (1999), Flynn Carsen in The Librarian franchise (2004, 2006, 2008, 2014–2018), and Tom Mason in the science fiction series Falling Skies (2011–2015). He was nominated for a Critics' Choice Award for his performance in the CBS miniseries The Red Line (2019). He was part of the ensemble cast of the Prime Video crime dramedy Leverage: Redemption (2021–2025). In addition to his television career, Wyle had supporting roles in films such as A Few Good Men (1992), Donnie Darko (2001), and Enough (2002). He served as artistic producer of the Blank Theatre Company in Los Angeles for over 20 years.

== Early life ==
Noah Strausser Speer Wyle was born on June 4, 1971, at Cedars of Lebanon Hospital in Hollywood, Los Angeles. His mother, Marjorie "Marty" Speer, worked as a nurse at East Hollywood's Kaiser Hospital. His father, Stephen Wyle, was an electrical engineer and entrepreneur. Wyle's paternal grandparents were prominent figures in Los Angeles; his grandfather, Frank Wyle, was a mechanical engineer who founded the aerospace company Wyle Laboratories and his grandmother, Edith R. Wyle, was a painter who established the Los Angeles Craft and Folk Art Museum. Wyle spent a lot of time as a child at his grandparents' 4,000-acre cattle ranch in North Fork, California and described his family as "half-city, half-country mice". Wyle's mother is Episcopalian and was raised in Kentucky. His father is Jewish; the Wyle surname was originally Weil, and his ancestors were from Ukraine and Russia. Wyle grew up feeling "culturally" Jewish but did not practice any religion.

Wyle's parents divorced in 1977, when he was six years old, and both remarried. Wyle was "greatly influenced" by his stepparents; his stepmother, Deborah, was a teacher while his stepfather, James C. Katz, was a film preservationist and producer.. Wyle's step-maternal grandfather was renowned filmmaker John Sturges. In the 1980s, Katz worked as a senior executive at Universal Studios and a young Wyle worked in craft services on movie sets and appeared as an uncredited extra in Paul Bartel's Lust in the Dust (1985). From his parents' marriage, Wyle has an older sister, Alexandra, and a younger brother, Aaron. He has a younger half-sister, Jessica, from his father's second marriage and three step-siblings from stepfather Katz's first marriage.

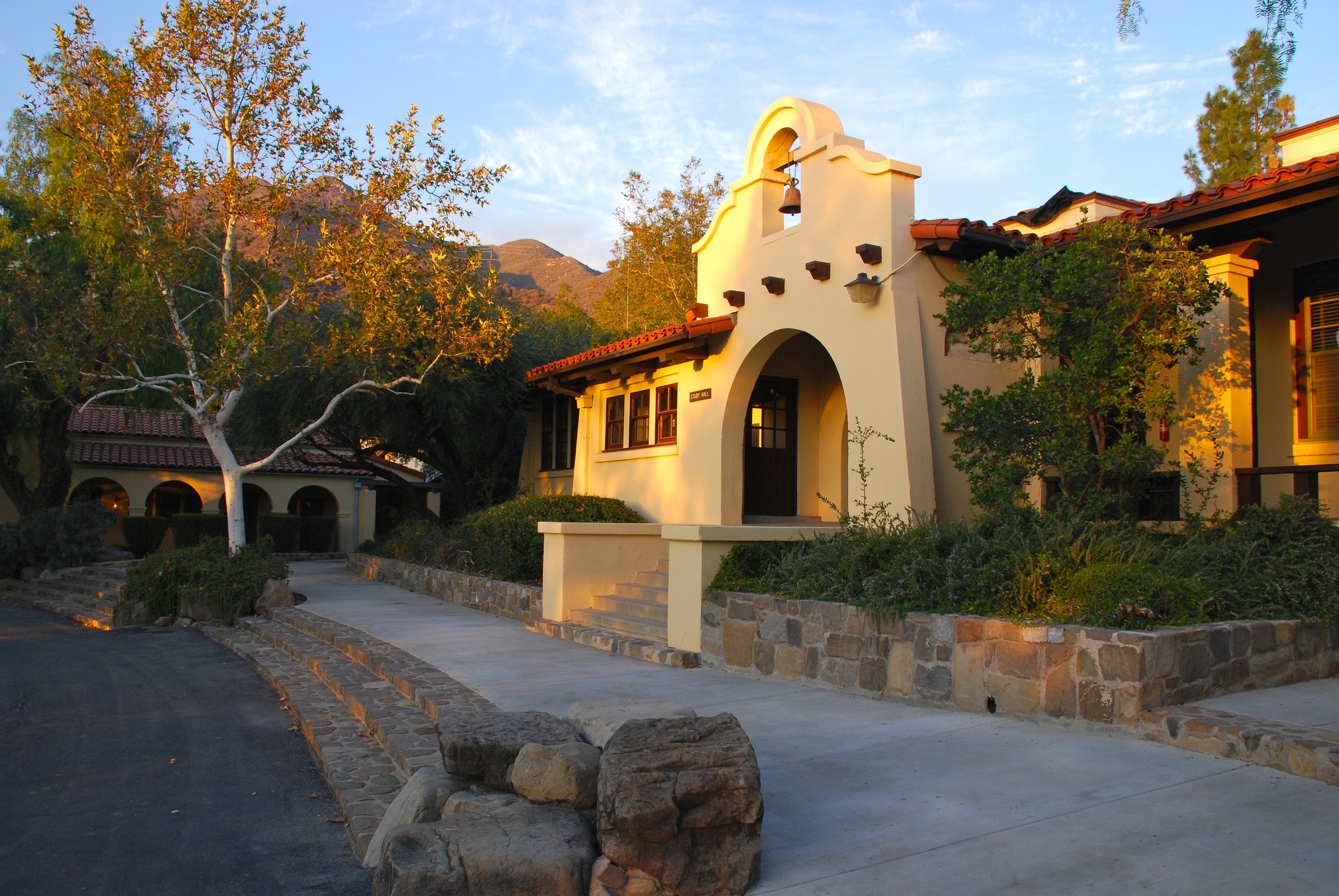
Wyle was a boarding student at The Thacher School.

Wyle was educated at Gardner Street Elementary School in Hollywood and Oakwood School in North Hollywood. He then spent four years at The Thacher School, a preparatory boarding school in Ojai, California known for its compulsory horseback riding program. He struggled academically, particularly in math and science, and was placed on probation in his freshman year. He ultimately graduated with a "decent" GPA and later wondered whether undiagnosed mild ADHD had contributed to his difficulties. Wyle had always been "enamored" with show business growing up in Hollywood and he first acted on stage in his sophomore year at Thacher. Encouraged by the audience response, he went on to act in, write and direct school plays. He attended the Cherubs Theatre Arts program at Northwestern University in the summer of his junior year and returned to high school "really focused" on becoming a professional actor. He was the first person in his family "in generations" not to attend college.

== Career ==
=== 1990–1994: Early roles and rise to fame on ER ===
After graduating from high school in 1989, Wyle moved into an apartment on Hollywood Boulevard, signed with an agent and began taking acting classes. His parents were only willing to financially support a college education and he worked as a busboy and then waiter at the Bel Age Hotel's Diaghilev restaurant. He appeared in Los Angeles stage productions and made a one-line appearance in the NBC miniseries Blind Faith (1990). His first credited movie role was in the family drama Crooked Hearts (1991), with Peter Rainer of the Los Angeles Times remarking upon his "appealingly awe-struck innocence". He appeared as a Hitler Youth leader in the historical drama Swing Kids (1993), as a high school student in the coming-of-age ensemble There Goes My Baby (1994) and as Lancelot in the Lifetime movie Guinevere (1994). His most notable casting in this period was in the courtroom drama A Few Good Men (1992), directed by Rob Reiner and written by Aaron Sorkin. Wyle had what Sorkin described as "a small, featured role as an endearingly dimwitted Marine corporal." The film was a box office success and was nominated for Best Picture at the 1993 Academy Awards.

Original cast of ER (1994–1995)

At the age of 22, Wyle was focused on appearing in "movies and plays" but was persuaded by his agent to audition for the television pilot of an NBC medical drama called ER, created by Michael Crichton and executive-produced by Steven Spielberg. The character of medical student John Carter was initially conceived of as comic relief and the casting director was impressed by Wyle's facility for "physical comedy" during the audition process. Wyle himself felt a personal connection: "I identified with him being born with a silver spoon in his mouth and it never quite fitting." After filming the ER pilot, Wyle auditioned for the part of Ross Geller in another NBC pilot, Friends; producers wanted him to film a screen test for the network but had to first wait to see whether ER would get picked up for a full season. ER tested highly with audiences, was ordered for a full season and began airing on September 19, 1994. In an early review, Tom Shales of the Washington Post described Carter as the "point of entry" character and praised Wyle's "achingly ingenuous performance as the young doctor-to-be." Within weeks, ER became the second most-watched show on television after Seinfeld. The main cast — Wyle, Anthony Edwards, George Clooney, Eriq La Salle, Sherry Stringfield and Julianna Margulies — rose to fame and Wyle, the youngest ensemble member, later credited the others as "role models ... I feel very fortunate to have started exactly when I did in the company of those actors. They taught me an incredible amount."

=== 1995–2005: Continued ER success ===
ER was a cultural phenomenon and is now considered one of the all-time greatest television shows. It was the most-watched show on American television for three years — in its second, third and fifth seasons — and average viewing figures often exceeded 30 million. At its peak, the show attracted 47.8 million viewers. Wyle and Clooney guest-starred as doctors in an episode of Friends (1995) and Wyle played an exaggerated version of himself in the sitcom The Larry Sanders Show (1995), sharing scenes with Mandy Patinkin, a family friend. He appeared as a doctor in Sesame Street (1996) and as a veterinarian in a Margulies-hosted episode of Saturday Night Live (2000). For his performance in ER, Wyle was nominated for five consecutive Emmy Awards for Outstanding Supporting Actor in a Drama Series and three consecutive Golden Globe Awards for Best Supporting Actor. As part of the ensemble cast, he won four Screen Actors Guild Awards, with a further three nominations. By 2001, Wyle had become one of the highest-paid actors in history for a television drama, earning an estimated $9 million per season.

In between seasons of ER, Wyle continued to do film work. He was offered parts in Spielberg's Saving Private Ryan (1998) and Clooney's Good Night, and Good Luck (2005) but was unable to accept either due to ER's nine-month filming schedule. He starred in the independent family drama The Myth of Fingerprints (1997) and made a cameo in the comedy Can't Stop Dancing (1999). He portrayed Steve Jobs in TNT's Pirates of Silicon Valley (1999), which was filmed concurrently with ER. Wyle was apprehensive about the role until he watched the documentary Triumph of the Nerds and then "knew I'd kick myself for the rest of my life if I didn't play this part." Caryn James of The New York Times said the role was "savvily" played, while Steve Silberman of Wired found the resemblance "uncanny" and noted that the actor "nails Steve Jobs' body language." Jobs himself considered the television movie "brutal" and "mean-spirited": "But as an actor, Noah Wyle definitely had done his homework on me in terms of my mannerisms and my quirks. So I called him the next day, just to tell him I thought he did a nice job." At Jobs' invitation, Wyle addressed the 1999 NY Macworld Expo audience in character. He then had a series of supporting roles; playing the President's interpreter in the televised broadcast play Fail Safe (2000), a science teacher in the thriller Donnie Darko (2001), a mob enforcer in Scenes of the Crime (2001), an unsupportive husband in White Oleander (2002) and a corrupt police officer in Enough (2002). Wyle had starring roles in the TNT adventure movie The Librarian: Quest for the Spear (2004) and the independent drama The Californians (2005).

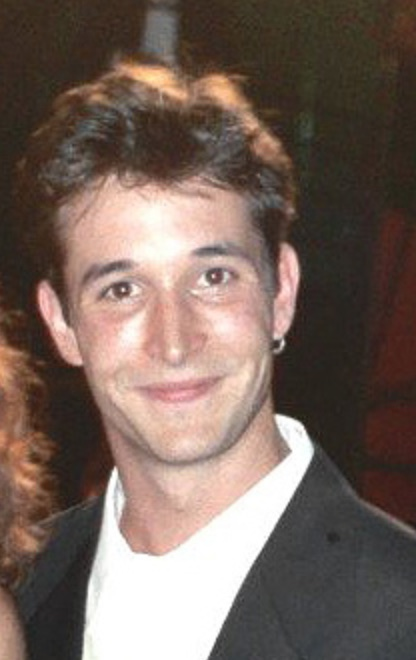
Wyle at the 1995 Emmy Awards

During his time on ER, Wyle remained involved with the Los Angeles-based Blank Theatre Company, where he had first worked as a teenage actor. He starred in the 1995 production of The 24th Day at the Coronet Theatre. In 1997, he became the company's artistic producer. His leadership role involved "constant fundraising" and "grant writing"; he personally donated the money for the acquisition of the 2nd Stage Theatre premises. Over the years, he acted in many entries for the annual Young Playwrights Festival, describing the experience as one of the "most gratifying" of his career. For his work as a producer of The Wild Party in 2005, he won an NAACP Theatre Award.

In 2005, in ER's eleventh season, Wyle became the final cast member from the original ensemble to leave. Following the birth of his first child in late 2002, he had taken extended paternity leave. However, he ultimately found the gruelling work schedule incompatible with "the kind of parent I want to be": "I’ve always said about our show that there’s really no point in leaving unless you’re ready to change your life. You can’t find better material or work with nicer people or a better crew." In reviewing his final episode, Matt Zoller Seitz of the Star-Ledger described Wyle as the "heart and soul of ER" and praised a performance "without a false note": "Even when the show's plot contrivances were laughable, you took John Carter seriously, because Wyle's performance demanded it ... Together with the show's writing staff, chiefly executive producer John Wells, who wrote some of Carter's best scenes, Wyle gave the character an emotional, intellectual and philosophical consistency, and a depth that let us deduce what he was thinking and feeling even when he wasn't speaking."

Wyle returned in 2006 to guest star in four episodes of the twelfth season and again in 2009 for five episodes of the show's fifteenth and final season, including the series finale. By the end of the show's run, he had appeared in 254 episodes, more than any other major cast member. Wyle later said he never felt "pigeonholed" by Carter: "If I'd stayed being the comic relief character who was always screwing up, that may have been frustrating but he kept growing as I kept growing." Wyle regularly cited Alan Alda — who portrayed a doctor for eleven seasons on M*A*S*H and later guest-starred on ER — as a source of inspiration. He described Alda as "a hero to me as a kid, and he still is ... He is the model I have in my head of an actor who's had a really beautiful career but for the most part is identified with one role. That doesn't scare me when I think about it in those terms."

=== 2006–2019: Falling Skies and The Librarians ===
Wyle returned to the stage in 2006, playing Salvador Dalí in a well-reviewed production of Lobster Alice at his Blank Theatre Company's 2nd Stage Theatre. (Wyle would remain in his role as artistic producer of the Blank Theatre Company for over twenty years before stepping down.) He reprised the role of unlikely action hero Flynn Carsen in two TNT television film sequels, The Librarian: Return to King Solomon's Mines (2006) and The Librarian: Curse of the Judas Chalice (2008), and has said the character "encapsulates all the reasons I wanted to be an actor." He had supporting roles in three 2008 movies; he played a lawyer in the political thriller Nothing but the Truth, a journalist in the coming-of-age drama An American Affair and Donald Evans in Oliver Stone's W. (2008). Also in 2008, Wyle and Alan Alda starred in an Alda-directed production of L'Histoire du soldat at New York's 92nd Street Y, having previously worked together on ER and in the film Nothing But the Truth. Wyle later described the experience as "one of the highlights of my life and career." His lead performance in the satirical comedy Queen of the Lot (2010) was well-reviewed.

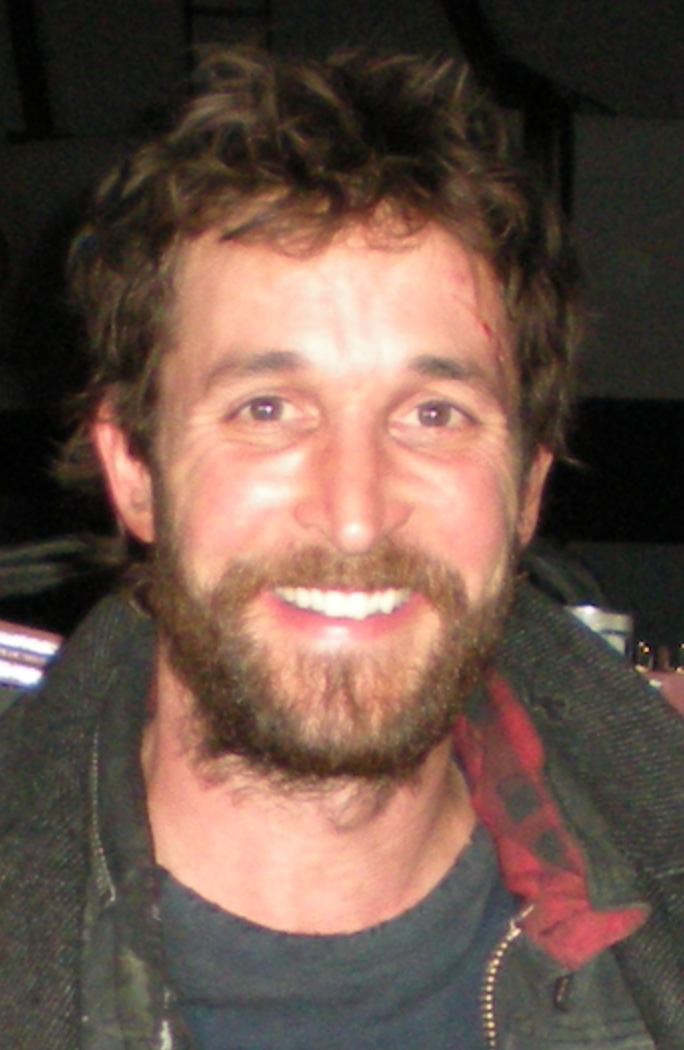
Wyle on the set of Falling Skies in 2012

Six years after leaving ER, Wyle felt “an itch” to return to regular television work and began starring in TNT's sci-fi series Falling Skies (2011–2015). He hoped that its much shorter seasons would allow for a better work-life balance than his time on ER. He portrayed Tom Mason, a former history professor who became the second-in-command of an army regiment fighting aliens in post-apocalyptic Boston. He was producer Steven Spielberg's "first choice" for the role: "I tried to get him for Private Ryan, but his schedule didn't permit that. I've been determined to work with Noah." Wyle was a producer in later seasons and directed an episode of the show's fifth and final season. He later said that, while "grateful" for the introduction to filmmaking, it had been "hard" to work away from family in Canada on a show that "in five seasons had six show runners." He guest-starred in episodes of Lab Rats (2013) and Drunk History (2015). He appeared as a business executive in the sports film Snake & Mongoose (2013) and as a pot dealer in the Appalachian thriller The World Made Straight (2015). In 2015, Wyle and Graham Yost, an executive producer on Falling Skies, wrote a limited series set during World War II. Although the project did not move beyond development at FX, Wyle later said working with Yost gave him the confidence to further pursue writing.

Wyle likened the TNT series The Librarians (2014–2018) to his "film school"; he produced the show and was part of the writer's room, writing two episodes and directing five. Hesitant to take on a leading role so soon after Falling Skies, Wyle opted for a recurring role as Flynn Carsen, with the series introducing three new librarians as central characters. He appeared more regularly in later seasons. He appeared in an episode of the sitcom Angie Tribeca (2016) and made a cameo appearance as John Stanley Pottinger in the political thriller Mark Felt: The Man Who Brought Down the White House (2017). His lead performance as a gunshot victim in the independent drama Shot (2017) was praised. Rex Reed of Observer described him as an "always excellent and under-valued actor" while Gary Goldstein of the Los Angeles Times wrote of a "strong and empathetic turn". In 2018, Wyle starred in an episode of Matthew Weiner's anthology drama series The Romanoffs.

Wyle's performance as a grieving husband in the eight-part limited CBS series The Red Line (2019) was critically acclaimed. Matt Zoller Seitz of New York Magazine praised "a career-capping performance": "It’s easy to take his brand of unfussy, direct acting for granted, but he’s so moving here [that] it’s impossible not to appreciate all the excellent work he’s done over the decades, and continues to do." Amy Amatangelo of Paste Magazine found the show "clunky" but said it served as a reminder of "how great an actor Wyle is": "He brings depth and nuance to a man who is in deep, deep grief." Hank Stuever of the Washington Post described it as a "knockout performance": "[He] fearlessly weeps, rages and broods from scene to scene, lending particular depth to playing a gay widower doing his best to raise a child and recover. He embraces the role with an energy and sense of dignity that might surprise more than a few viewers." Wyle was nominated for a Critics' Choice Award.

=== 2020–present: Resurgence with The Pitt ===
By 2020, Wyle had worked largely in genre television for fifteen years and felt “kind of at peace" with no longer appearing in shows that were part of "the zeitgeist". Dean Devlin, show runner of The Librarians, invited Wyle to join the ensemble cast of the Prime Video crime dramedy Leverage: Redemption (since 2021). He plays Harry Wilson, a New Orleans corporate lawyer who seeks redemption after a career spent representing morally questionable clients. In the show's first two seasons, Wyle directed five episodes. He joined the writer's room in season two, writing one episode. Due to other work commitments, his character did not appear in some episodes of the third season and he was instead credited as a special guest star. In 2022, he starred in the independent thriller At the Gates.

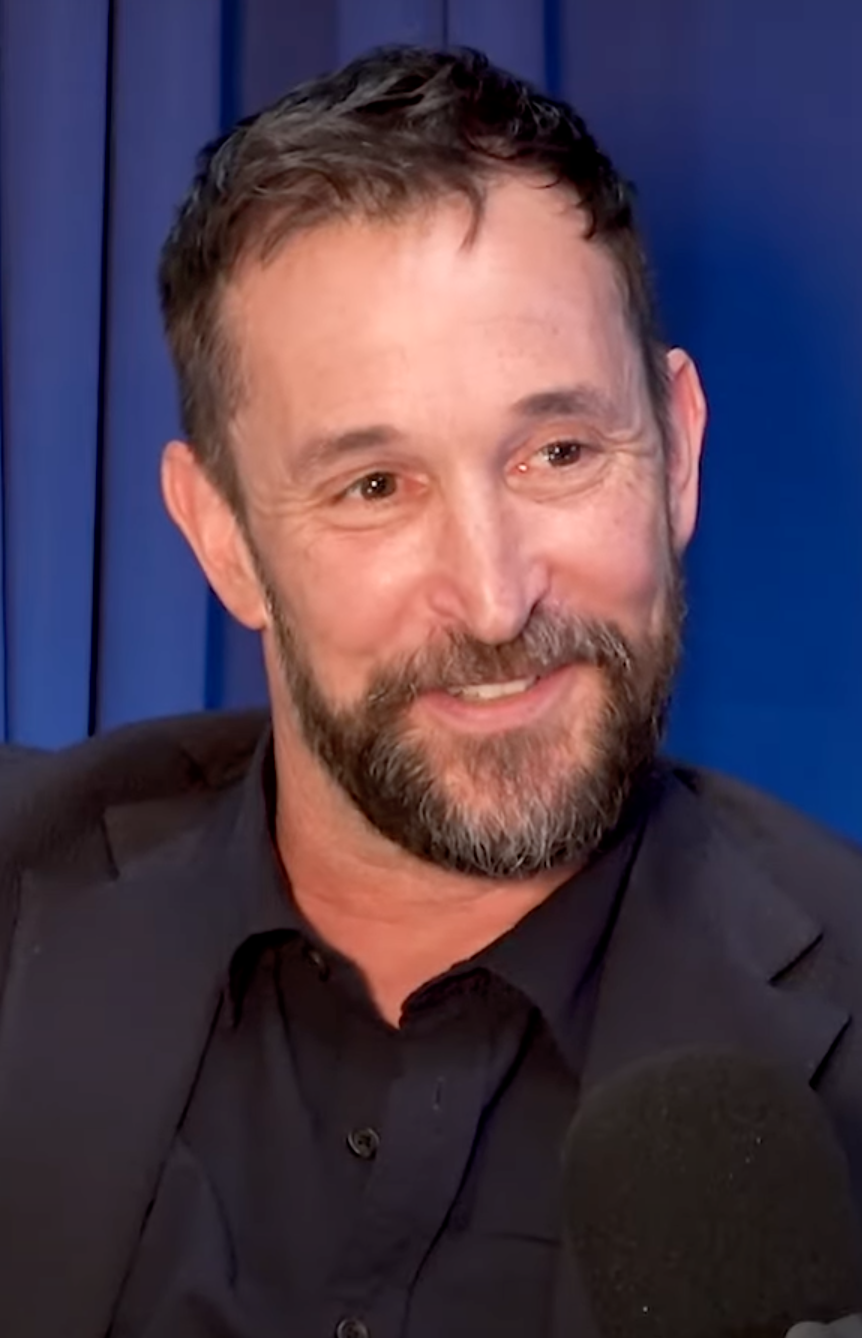
Wyle in 2024

Wyle experienced a career resurgence when he began starring as Dr. Michael "Robby" Robinavitch in the HBO Max medical drama The Pitt (since 2025). The show became a breakout hit, with an average of 18 million viewers per episode. Wyle is also an executive producer of the show and part of the writing staff. He has written four episodes of the show and directed an episode of its second season. The idea originated when Wyle suggested to ER showrunner John Wells and executive producer R. Scott Gemmill that they develop a television show about Dr. Carter's experiences as a frontline worker during the pandemic. When negotiations with the estate of ER creator Michael Crichton broke down in early 2023, the creative team conceived of a new show, with Wyle using his great-grandmother's maiden name to portray a Jewish character for the first time in his career.

Wyle's performance was widely acclaimed. He won the Television Critics Association Award for Individual Achievement in Drama and the Emmy Award for Outstanding Lead Actor in a Drama Series; it was the sixth Emmy nomination of his career, his first nomination in the lead actor category, and his first win overall. David Sims of The Atlantic described him as "one of TV’s most underrated actors." Richard Lawson of Vanity Fair praised a "commanding performance": "Wyle is an endlessly compelling lead ... His bedside tone, personable and clinically distant at once, is a precise depiction of the guarded compassion of a real doctor. Wyle deftly manages the shifts in emotional temperature as each hour unfolds, selling us on the relentless roller coaster of it all." Laura Bogart of The A.V. Club described it as "a lead performance that feels truly lived-in": "Wyle is remarkable at giving empathy a dramatic alacrity, making the act of listening rich with purpose and potential." Kristen Baldwin of Entertainment Weekly described him as "a master at compassionate calm" and said the emotional unravelling of his character was "executed with breathtaking skill."

In September 2026, Wyle won Outstanding Performance by a Male Actor in a Drama Series at the 78th Emmy Awards for The Pitt Season 2. The following month, he was named People's Sexiest Man Alive.

== Personal life ==
=== Family ===
Wyle lives between Los Feliz, Los Angeles and the Santa Ynez Valley, California, where he purchased a ranch in 1999.

Wyle was married to make-up artist Tracy Warbin from 2000 to 2010. They met on the set of The Myth of Fingerprints in early 1996, became engaged in 1999 and married in 2000. They have a son, Owen Strausser Wyle (born November 9, 2002), and a daughter, Auden Wyle (born October 15, 2005). Wyle and Warbin separated in late 2009 and later divorced.

Wyle is married to actress Sara Wells. They met in late 2010 and were married in June 2014 at their home in the Santa Ynez Valley, California. The ceremony was officiated by Jan Dance, the wife of David Crosby, with whom Wyle had formed a close friendship in the late 1990s. Their daughter was born in June 2015.

=== Activism ===
From 2002 to 2005, Wyle served as a director on the Hollywood executive board of the Screen Actors Guild. In 2023, he was a frequent picketer during both the Writers Guild of America strike and the SAG-AFTRA strike. In 2025, he supported the Stay in LA awareness campaign to keep Hollywood production in Los Angeles and spoke in support of Los Angeles-based crew members at a press conference organized by California Governor Gavin Newsom to mark the passing of a bill to expand the state’s film tax credit program.

During and after his time on ER, Wyle advocated for healthcare reform and other health-related causes. In 1998, he and President Jimmy Carter filmed a public service announcement on the set of ER to raise awareness about eradicating guinea worm disease. During the Kosovo War in 1999, Wyle was invited by Doctors of the World to spend three weeks observing work in a Macedonian refugee camp. Upon his return to the United States, Wyle joined the executive committee of Human Rights Watch and became the spokesperson for MPT (Moving Past Trauma). He encouraged ER's writing staff to include a storyline on international triage medicine, which led to episodes in the Democratic Republic of the Congo and Darfur. In 2004, Wyle was the spokesperson for the Cover the Uninsured campaign and advocated for universal coverage; he filmed PSAs, visited Washington and New York, and wrote an op-ed for the Los Angeles Times. In 2012, Wyle supported the disability rights group ADAPT and was arrested during a protest on Capitol Hill to fight against Medicaid cuts for the elderly and people with disabilities. In 2019, Wyle joined the board of KultureCity, a non-profit organisation that advocates for sensory-inclusive public spaces. In 2025, Wyle wrote an op-ed for USA Today and spoke alongside healthcare professionals at a panel on Capitol Hill, advocating for three bills to support frontline workers in the areas of mental health resources, pay disparity and administrative burdens.

Additionally, Wyle has worked with animal rights charities including the World Wildlife Fund and the Return to Freedom wild horse sanctuary. He narrated a documentary for People Helping People, a local charity that supports low-income families in the Santa Ynez Valley.

== Filmography ==
=== Film ===
Year	Title	Role	Notes	Ref.
1985	Lust in the Dust	Young Man	Uncredited role	
1991	Crooked Hearts	Ask Warren		
1992	A Few Good Men	Corporal Jeffrey Owen Barnes		
1993	Swing Kids	Emil Lutz		
1994	There Goes My Baby	Michael Finnegan		
1997	The Myth of Fingerprints	Warren	Also associate producer	
1999	Can't Stop Dancing	Poe		
2001	Donnie Darko	Dr. Kenneth Monnitoff		
2001	Scenes of the Crime	Seth		
2002	Enough	Robbie		
2002	White Oleander	Mark Richards		
2003	Fall of Knipple	Ed	Short film	
2005	The Californians	Gavin Ransom		
2008	Nothing But the Truth	Avril Aaronson		
2008	An American Affair	Mike Stafford		
2008	W.	Donald Evans		
2010	Below the Beltway	Hunter Patrick		
2010	Queen of the Lot	Aaron Lambert		
2013	Snake & Mongoose	Arthur Spear		
2015	The World Made Straight	Leonard Shuler		
2017	Mark Felt: The Man Who Brought Down the White House	John Stanley Pottinger		
2017	Shot	Mark Newman	Also executive producer	
2022	At the Gates	Peter Barris		
2025	Feel	Sitter 20		

=== Television ===
Year	Title	Role	Notes	Ref.
1990	Blind Faith	Eric	Miniseries; 2 episodes	
1994	Guinevere	Lancelot	Television film	
1994–2006, 2009	ER	Dr. John Carter	Main role (seasons 1–11, 15), Guest star (season 12); 241 episodes	
1995	Friends	Dr. Jeffrey Rosen	Episode: "The One with Two Parts: Part 2"	
1995	The Larry Sanders Show	Himself	Episode: "Eight"	
1996	Sesame Street	Dr. Colburn	Episodes: "Maria Goes to the Hospital Parts 1 & 2"	
1999	Pirates of Silicon Valley	Steve Jobs	Television film	
1999	Save Our History: America's Most Endangered 1999	Himself (host)	Television special	
2000	Fail Safe	Buck	Television film	
2000	Beggars and Choosers	Davis G. Green	Episode: "The Naked Truth"	
2004	The Librarian: Quest for the Spear	Flynn Carsen	Television film	
2006	The Librarian: Return to King Solomon's Mines	Flynn Carsen	Television film; also producer	
2008	The Librarian: Curse of the Judas Chalice	Flynn Carsen	Television film; also producer	
2011–2015	Falling Skies	Tom Mason	Main role; 52 episodes (also director & producer)	
2013	Lab Rats	Dr. Evans	Episode: "Twas the Mission Before Christmas"	
2014	Phineas and Ferb	Martin (voice)	Episode: "Night of the Living Pharmacists"	
2014–2018	The Librarians	Flynn Carsen	Recurring role; 23 episodes (also writer, director, & executive producer)	
2015	Drunk History	Thomas Nast	Episode: "Journalism"	
2016	Angie Tribeca	Lewis Alcindor	Episode: "Organ Trail"	
2017	Perfect Citizen	Deck	Unsold television pilot	
2018	The Romanoffs	Ivan	Episode: "The Royal We"	
2019	The Red Line	Daniel Calder	Main role; 8 episodes	
2021–2025	Leverage: Redemption	Harry Wilson	Main role (seasons 1–2), Recurring role (season 3); 36 episodes (also writer & director)	
2025–present	The Pitt	Dr. Michael "Robby" Robinavitch	Main role; 30 episodes (also writer, director, & executive producer)	
2025–present	The Librarians: The Next Chapter	—N/a	Executive producer	
2026	The Simpsons	Doctor (voice)	Episode: "Irrational Treasure"	

== Awards and nominations ==
=== Actor Awards ===
Year	Category	Work	Result	Ref.
1995	Outstanding Performance by an Ensemble in a Drama Series	ER	Nominated	
1996	Outstanding Performance by an Ensemble in a Drama Series	ER	Won	
1997	Outstanding Performance by an Ensemble in a Drama Series	ER	Won	
1998	Outstanding Performance by an Ensemble in a Drama Series	ER	Won	
1999	Outstanding Performance by an Ensemble in a Drama Series	ER	Won	
2000	Outstanding Performance by an Ensemble in a Drama Series	ER	Nominated	
2001	Outstanding Performance by an Ensemble in a Drama Series	ER	Nominated	
2026	Outstanding Performance by an Ensemble in a Drama Series	The Pitt	Won	
2026	Outstanding Performance by a Male Actor in a Drama Series	The Pitt	Won	

=== Critics' Choice Television Awards ===
Year	Category	Work	Result	Ref.
2020	Best Actor in a Movie/Miniseries	The Red Line	Nominated	
2026	Best Actor in a Drama Series	The Pitt	Won	

=== Golden Globe Awards ===
Year	Category	Work	Result	Ref.
1997	Best Supporting Actor – Series, Miniseries or Television Film	ER	Nominated	
1998	Best Supporting Actor – Series, Miniseries or Television Film	ER	Nominated	
1999	Best Supporting Actor – Series, Miniseries or Television Film	ER	Nominated	
2026	Best Actor in a Television Series – Drama	The Pitt	Won	

=== Primetime Emmy Awards ===
Year	Category	Work	Result	Ref.
1995	Outstanding Supporting Actor in a Drama Series	ER	Nominated	
1996	Outstanding Supporting Actor in a Drama Series	ER	Nominated	
1997	Outstanding Supporting Actor in a Drama Series	ER	Nominated	
1998	Outstanding Supporting Actor in a Drama Series	ER	Nominated	
1999	Outstanding Supporting Actor in a Drama Series	ER	Nominated	
2025	Outstanding Drama Series	The Pitt	Won	
2025	Outstanding Lead Actor in a Drama Series	The Pitt	Won	
2026	Outstanding Drama Series	The Pitt	Won	
2026	Outstanding Lead Actor in a Drama Series	The Pitt	Won	
2026	Outstanding Directing for a Drama Series	The Pitt	Nominated	

=== Writer Guild of America Awards ===
Year	Category	Work	Result	Ref.
2026	Television: Dramatic Series	The Pitt	Won	
2026	Television: New Series	The Pitt	Won	

=== Miscellaneous awards ===
Organizations	Year	Category	Work	Result	Ref.
AARP Movies for Grownups Awards	2026	Best Actor – Television	The Pitt	Won	
AACTA International Awards	2026	Best Actor in a Series	The Pitt	Nominated	
Astra TV Awards	2025	Best Actor in a Drama Series	The Pitt	Won	
Dorian TV Awards	2025	Best TV Performance - Drama	The Pitt	Won	
Film Independent Spirit Awards	2026	Best Lead Performance in a New Scripted Series	The Pitt	Nominated	
Gotham TV Awards	2025	Breakthrough Drama Series	The Pitt	Won	
Gotham TV Awards	2025	Outstanding Lead Performance in a Drama Series	The Pitt	Nominated	
Satellite Awards	2026	Best Actor in a Series, Drama or Genre	The Pitt	Nominated	
Saturn Awards	2005	Best Actor on Television	The Librarian: Quest for the Spear	Nominated	
Saturn Awards	2007	Best Actor on Television	The Librarian: Return to King Solomon's Mines	Nominated	
Saturn Awards	2009	Best Actor on Television	The Librarian: Curse of the Judas Chalice	Nominated	
Saturn Awards	2012	Best Actor on Television	Falling Skies	Nominated	
Saturn Awards	2014	Best Actor on Television	Falling Skies	Nominated	
Saturn Awards	2015	Best Actor on Television	Falling Skies	Nominated	
Saturn Awards	2015	Artist Showcase Award	Himself	Won	
TCA Awards	2025	Individual Achievement in Drama	The Pitt	Won	
