= The Californians (film) =

- DVD cover
- Directed by: Jonathan Parker
- Written by: Henry James; Catherine DiNapoli; Jonathan Parker
- Produced by: Scott M. Rosenfelt; Catherine DiNapoli
- Starring: Noah Wyle; Illeana Douglas; Kate Mara; Joanne Whalley; Keith Carradine; Valerie Perrine; Jane Lynch; Michael Parks; Cloris Leachman
- Cinematography: Steven Fierberg
- Edited by: Rick LeCompte
- Music by: Neils Bye Nielsen
- Distributed by: Fabrication Films
- Release date: October 21, 2005
- Running time: 87 minutes
- Country: United States
- Language: English
- Budget: $500,000

The Californians is a 2005 American independent drama film starring Noah Wyle. It is a modern-day adaptation of the 1886 Henry James novel The Bostonians, with the location moved from Boston to Marin County, California, and with the political topic driving the plot changed from feminism to environmentalism. The Californians is the second film adaptation of The Bostonians, after the 1984 film The Bostonians.

== Plot ==
Gavin Ransom (Noah Wyle) is a successful real estate developer who has made a tidy fortune putting up gated communities filled with expensive suburban homes all over California. Ransom intends to put up another such development in the as-yet-untouched hillsides of Northern California's Marin County, and, just as he's expected, a number of folks living nearby are objecting to the project, including his sister Olive (Illeana Douglas), an environmental activist who has sided with longtime resident Eileen Boatwright (Cloris Leachman) and progressive lawyer Sybil (Jane Lynch) against the development.

Olive and her compatriots get some unexpected support when Zoe Tripp (Kate Mara), a modern folk singer and the daughter of old-school Marin County hippies (Keith Carradine and Valerie Perrine), takes an interest in their protests and begins singing out against Gavin's proposal with guitar in hand. Gavin unexpectedly finds himself growing powerfully infatuated with Zoe, and Olive, a long-closeted lesbian, is equally taken with her; consequently, as the siblings battle against building several dozen cookie-cutter mansions, they also wage a private war for the affections of the young singer.

== Cast ==
- Noah Wyle as Gavin Ransom
- Illeana Douglas as Olive Ransom
- Kate Mara as Zoe Tripp
- Cloris Leachman as Eileen Boatwright
- Joanne Whalley as Luna
- Keith Carradine as Elton Tripp
- Valerie Perrine as Lenora Tripp
- Jane Lynch as Sybill Platt
- Michael Panes as Marion Pardon
- Terry McGovern as Mr. Putterman
- Erika Luckett as Mary Ann
- Will Marchetti as Mayor
- Carl Bressler as Martin Berg
- Richard Gross as Contractor
- Kurtis Bedford as Reporter
- Charles Martinet as City Councilman
