= An American Affair (2008 film) =

2008 American film

- Promotional film poster
- Directed by: William Olsson
- Written by: Alex Metcalf
- Produced by: Kevin Leydon
- Starring: Gretchen Mol; James Rebhorn; Noah Wyle; Perrey Reeves; Mark Pellegrino; Cameron Bright
- Cinematography: David Insley
- Edited by: Scott Chestnut
- Music by: Dustin O'Halloran
- Distributed by: Screen Media Films
- Release dates: October 2008 (Zurich Film Festival); February 27, 2009 (United States)
- Running time: 93 minutes
- Country: United States
- Language: English
- Box office: $28,044 (domestic)

An American Affair, also known as Boy of Pigs, is a 2008 American independent period drama film directed by William Olsson and starring Gretchen Mol, James Rebhorn, Noah Wyle, Perrey Reeves, Mark Pellegrino, and Cameron Bright. It was released theatrically by Screen Media Films on February 27, 2009.

The film was shot in Baltimore in late 2006. It was written by Alex Metcalf, and produced by Kevin Leydon. Its soundtrack was created by Dustin O'Halloran. It premiered at the 2008 Zurich Film Festival under the title Boy of Pigs.

== Plot ==
In 1963, in the swirl of glamour and intrigue that turned President John F. Kennedy's Washington into Camelot, a young teenager, Adam Stafford has an inside view of JFK’s torrid affair with Adam's neighbor Catherine and secret CIA assassination plans. The assassination plan was influenced by a Cuban national in which America was having a revolutionary threat from Fidel Castro. Catherine kept a diary which entries were about the secrets of the President. This diary was secretly stolen from Catherine by Adam Stafford when she fell asleep. The contents of this diary were the cause of her murder by the CIA, presumably.

Adam is a thirteen year old boy attending Catholic school. Catherine moves across the street and hires Adam to do some gardening. Adam falls in love with his unattainable thirty something blonde beauty. His parents warn him that she has a reputation. In fact she is an artist and has been having an affair with President JFK. She is divorced from a man who works for the CIA. CIA operative Lucian keeps tabs on Catherine. Adam finds and keeps Catherine's diary. JFK is assassinated. Lucian comes to the Stafford home, searches and finds the diary, and burns the book telling Adam that sometimes people get confused with what is really true. Adam finds Catherine at the bottom of stairs dead.

== Cast ==
- Gretchen Mol as Catherine Caswell - Artist, divorcee, paramour of JFK, and neighbor (Based on Mary Pinchot Meyer)
- Cameron Bright as Adam Stafford - Teen neighbor
- Noah Wyle as Mike Stafford - Adam's father
- Perrey Reeves as Adrienne Stafford - Adam's mother
- Mark Pellegrino as Graham Caswell - Catherine's former husband (Based on Cord Meyer)
- James Rebhorn as Lucian Carver - CIA agent (Based on James Angleton)
- Lisa-Lisbeth Finney as Sister Mary Eunice - Teacher
- Laurel Astri as Faith - Adam's first kiss

== Background ==
The Catherine Caswell character and the events not involving the wholly fictional Adam Stafford are based on true life Mary Pinchot Meyer. The character CIA Agent Lucian Carver is heavily based on longtime CIA counterintelligence chief James Angleton, who was a well-known associate of both Mary Pinchot Meyer and her former husband Cord Meyer who was also a CIA official.

== Reception ==
On the review aggregator website Rotten Tomatoes, 17% of 36 critics' reviews are positive. The website's consensus reads: "With a plot both undercooked and cliche riddled, An American Affair unsuccessfully mixes a coming-of-age story and a presidential conspiracy thriller."

Betsy Sharkey, film critic for the Los Angeles Times, found the film an affair not to remember. She stated it is a "mess of a film that can't quite figure out what it wants to be: an illicit love story, a political thriller or a coming-of-age set piece". She did like the acting of Gretchen Mol.

== See also ==
- Cultural depictions of John F. Kennedy
