= Crooked Hearts =

- Theatrical release poster
- Directed by: Michael Bortman
- Written by: Michael Bortman
- Produced by: Gil Friesen; Dale Pollock; Rick Stevenson
- Starring: Vincent D'Onofrio; Jennifer Jason Leigh; Peter Berg; Cindy Pickett; Juliette Lewis; Noah Wyle; Peter Coyote
- Cinematography: Tak Fujimoto
- Edited by: Richard Francis-Bruce
- Music by: Mark Isham
- Production companies: A&M Films
- Distributed by: Metro-Goldwyn-Mayer
- Release date: September 6, 1991
- Running time: 113 minutes
- Country: United States
- Language: English
- Box office: $30,964

Crooked Hearts is a 1991 American drama film written and directed by Michael Bortman. The film stars Vincent D'Onofrio, Jennifer Jason Leigh, Peter Berg, Cindy Pickett, Juliette Lewis, Noah Wyle and Peter Coyote. The film was released on September 6, 1991, by Metro-Goldwyn-Mayer.

== Plot ==
Tom Warren returns home from Berkeley College where he dropped out. Tom returns to the family where the close knit family celebrated their misfortunes and bad luck at yearly parties. Charlie the oldest brother holds a secret that could rip the family apart. The film centers around this secret and the Warren family.

== Cast ==
- Vincent D'Onofrio as Charley Warren
- Jennifer Jason Leigh as Marriet Hoffman
- Peter Berg as Tom Warren
- Cindy Pickett as Jill Warren
- Juliette Lewis as Cassie Warren
- Noah Wyle as Ask Warren
- Peter Coyote as Edward Warren
- Wendy Gazelle as Eileen
- Marg Helgenberger as Jennetta
- Deanna Milligan as Julie
- Sacha Moiseiwitsch as Bonita
- Joshua Jackson as Tom
- Ryan Jorgenson as Ask
- Ian Tracey as Limber Watkins
- Vincent Gale as Charley's Friend
- Doreen Ramus as Woman in Bakery
- David Longworth as Gas Station Owner
- Babs Chula as Neighbor Woman
- Dee Jay Jackson as Fire Captain
- Curt Bonn as Fireman
- Kenneth Kantymir as John Heffel
- John Kernahan as Driver
