= 2008 Zurich Film Festival =

The third annual 2008 Zurich Film Festival ran from September 25 to October 5, 2008. Actor Peter Fonda will act as prexy of the feature film jury. The festival introduced a new section this year, Panorama D, dedicated to German-language film from Germany, Austria and Switzerland. The showcase opened with the Nicolette Krebitz-directed psychological drama The Heart Is a Dark Forest.

Highlights of the festival included Toronto and Venice Film Festival hits such as the Coen brothers' Burn After Reading, and the psychological Iraq war thriller, The Hurt Locker directed by Kathryn Bigelow, as well as Religulous, featuring Bill Maher and lensed by Larry Charles. Also screening is a documentary about filmmaker Roman Polanski directed by Marina Zenovich, Roman Polanski: Wanted and Desired. Two films at the festival featured the work of actor Ben Kingsley, Elegy directed by Isabel Coixet and The Wackness helmed by Jonathan Levine.

== Festival Hits & Features: Out of Competition ==
- Blindness - directed by Fernando Meirelles
- The Boy in the Striped Pyjamas - directed by Mark Herman
- Burn After Reading - directed by the Coen brothers
- Cloud 9 - directed by Andreas Dresen
- Crouching Tiger, Hidden Dragon (2000) directed by Ang Lee
- Eagle Eye - directed by D.J. Caruso
- Elegy - directed by Isabel Coixet
- The Hurt Locker - directed by Kathryn Bigelow
- Nights in Rodanthe - directed by George C. Wolfe
- Paris, Paris - directed by Christophe Barratier
- Religulous - directed by Larry Charles

== In Competition: Fiction ==
- Ballast directed by Lance Hammer
- Before the Fall directed by F. Javier Gutierrez
- Blood Appears - directed by Pablo Fendrik
- Boogie - directed by Radu Muntean
- Boy of Pigs directed by William Sten Olsson
- Dr. Alemán - directed by Tom Schreiber
- Dunya & Desie - directed by Dana Nechushtan
- For a Moment, Freedom directed by Arash T. Riahi
- Jerusalema - directed by Ralph Ziman
- The Man Who Loved Yngve directed by Stian Kristiansen
- Moscow, Belgium directed by Christophe van Rompaey
- Sell Out! directed by Yeo Joon Han
- A Thousand Oceans - directed by Luki Frieden
- Tulpan directed by Sergey Dvortsevoy
- The Wackness - directed by Jonathan Levine
- The World Is Big and Salvation Lurks Around the Corner directed by Stephan Komandarev

== In Competition: Documentary ==
- Brides of Allah - directed by Natalie Assouline
- My Life Inside - directed by Lucia Gaja
- The Flower Bridge - directed by Thomas Ciulei
- Suddenly, Last Winter - directed by Gustav Hofer & Luca Ragazzi
- Blind Loves - directed by Juraj Lehotsky
- The Art Star and the Sudanese Twins - directed by Pietra Brettkelly
- Roman Polanski: Wanted and Desired - directed by Marina Zenovich
- Mr. Rakowski - directed by Jan Diederen

== Jury ==
- Peter Fonda - head jurist
- Michael Dougherty
- Stephen Nemeth
- Claudia Puig
- Herve Schneid
- Dror Shaul
- Andrea Staka

Documentary Jury:

- Christian Frei
- Walter Huegli
- Lorna Tee
