= Hodgetts + Fung =

American design studio

Hodgetts + Fung, also known as HplusF, is an interdisciplinary design studio based in Culver City, California specializing in architectural design, advanced material fabrication, historical restorations, and exhibition design and is led by principals Craig Hodgetts and Hsinming Fung.

== Biography ==
In 1980, Ming Fung and Craig Hodgetts were part of a loose affiliation of Los Angeles architects known as the L.A. Ten. Hodgetts + Fung was founded in 1984 by Craig Hodgetts and Hsinming Fung. HplusF is a studio made up of architects and designers with special expertise in the design of unique places for learning, cultural events, and civic functions. These qualities are most prominent in the 1993 Temporary Library at UCLA, as well as the recently completed Wildbeast Pavilion at California Institute of the Arts, for which a folded steel cantilever provides an acoustically sophisticated setting for musical performance. The resulting integration of form and function reflects a process which is sensitive to abstract qualities as well as real-world constraints. Hodgetts + Fung is also renowned for their renovation work on iconic Los Angeles structures like the design and construction of the new Hollywood Bowl, and the renovation of the Egyptian Theater in Hollywood.

=== Principals ===
Craig Hodgetts attended Oberlin College, San Francisco State College, and University of California, Berkeley. He received his Master of Architecture from Yale School of Art and Architecture in 1966. Prior to Hodgetts + Fung, Craig Hodgetts' professional affiliations include working with the famed British architect Sir James Stirling and was the principal and co-founder of Studio Works with Robert Mangurian from 1968 - 1983. Craig holds two U.S. patents: one for the Building Blocks prefabricated modular classroom for the LAUSD, and one patent for LINC, a prefabricated, kit-of-parts housing system. Craig Hodgetts was one of the founding deans at California Institute of the Arts for the College of Design in 1969, has held visiting professorships at Yale, MIT, and he currently is a tenured professor of architecture at University of California, Los Angeles School of Architecture and Urban Design. In 2006, he won the Gold Medal Award from the American Institute of Architects, Los Angeles. He is currently teaching the UCLA SUPRASTUDIO focused on developing Elon Musk's Hyperloop concept, a pneumatic tube transporting riders from Los Angeles to San Francisco in 30 minutes.

Hsinming Fung received her Master of Architecture from University of California, Los Angeles in 1980. From 2002 - 2010 she served as the Director of Graduate Programs at the Southern California Institute of Architecture and in 2011 she became the Director of Academic Affairs. From 1999 to 2002 she was the Graduate Program Coordinator, Department of Architecture, College of Environmental Design, California State Polytechnic University, Pomona. She has held visiting professorships at Yale, MIT, and The Royal Academy of Coppenhagen. Hsinming Fung won the Rome Prize Advanced Fellowship in Design Art in 1991 and is a Fellow of the American Academy in Rome. In 1992 she won the Graham Foundation Grant for Research and Travel. She has also served as a National Peer for the General Services Administration in Washington, D.C., and in 2004 served on the National Endowment of the Arts Council. In 2006, she won the Gold Medal Award from the American Institute of Architects, Los Angeles. Hsinming Fung has also served on the executive board of the American Institute of Architects and currently serves on the board of the PLACES Journal. Hsinming Fung served as the President (2014–15) of the Association of Collegiate Schools of Architecture.

== Selected Projects ==
=== Architecture ===
- Ascend Amphitheater, Nashville, Tennessee, 2015
- Jesuit High School Chapel of the Martyrs of North America, Sacramento, California, 2014
- Donna Rio Bravo Land Port of Entry, Donna, Texas, 2010
- Menlo-Atherton Performing Art Center, Menlo-Atherton High School, Menlo, 2010
- The WildBeast Pavilion, California Institute of the Arts, Valencia, 2009
- The Downtown Independent Theater, Los Angeles, 2007
- Yamano Gakuen Tower Complex, Tokyo, Japan, 2007
- The design of the all newHollywood Bowl, Hollywood, 2004
- Los Angeles Public Library, Mariam Matthews Branch, Hyde Park, Los Angeles, 2004
- The Ira Gershwin Gallery at the Walt Disney Concert Hall, 2003
- World Savings and Loan Bank, Alhambra, 2001
- Sinclaire Pavilion, Art Center College of Design, Pasadena, 2001
- The American Cinematheque at the Egyptian Theater, Hollywood, 1998
- Mullin Sculpture Studio, Occidental College, Los Angeles, 1995
- Craft and Folk Art Museum, Los Angeles, 1995
- American Institute of Graphic Arts Gallery, 1995
- Panasonic Pavilion, Universal City, Los Angeles, 1992
- Temporary Powell (Towell) Library, University of California, Los Angeles, 1992
- Viso House, Hollywood, California, 1990
- Hemdale Film Corporation Office Complex, Los Angeles, California 1987

=== Exhibition Design ===
- "California Design 1930 – 1965: Living in a Modern Way" Los Angeles County Museum of Art, 2011
- "Islands of Evolution" California Academy of Sciences, San Francisco, 2009
- "T-Rex Thomas" Natural History Museum, Los Angeles, 2008
- "Visible Vault" Natural History Museum, Los Angeles, 2008
- "kē-ärō’-skŏŏr’ō (Chiaroscuro)" Southern California Institute of Architecture, 2007
- "The World of Charles and ray Eames" Library of Congress, Washington, D.C., Vitra Design Museum, Weil am Rhein, Germany, Los Angeles County Museum of Art, 1994 – 2000
- "Hall of Mirrors: Art and Film Since 1945" Museum of Contemporary Art, Los Angeles, 1996
- Microsoft E3 Pavilion, 1996 and 1997
- "ZKT Wave Power", Elektrizitatswerk Minden-Ravensberg (EMR) Headquarters, Bad Oeynhausen, Germany, 1997
- "Blueprints for Modern Living" Museum of Contemporary Art, Los Angeles, 1989

== Exhibitions ==
- US Pavilion: OFFICE US at the Venice Biennale, 2014
- A New Sculpturalism: Contemporary Architecture from Southern California, Museum of Contemporary Art, Los Angeles, June 2013
- Overdrive: L.A. Constructs the Future, 1940–1990, Getty Center, Los Angeles, 2012, and the National Building Institute, 2013
- Never Built: Los Angeles, A+D Museum, 2012
- Light My Way, Stranger, MAK Center for Art and Architecture, 2012
- Audience of Objects, Southern California Institute of Architecture, Casa Pulpa, February, 2011
- Venice Biennale, August 2010
- Chiaroscuro, Southern California Institute of Architecture August–September 2007
- Dialogues and Interventions, Recent Architecture Pasadena to L.A., Armory Center for the Arts, Pasadena, CA, June 10 - September 3, 2006
- La Citta Pulpa, University of California Los Angeles, May 12-June 7, 2006
- Whatever happened to L.A.?, (Studio Works) Southern California Institute of Architecture, September, 2005
- At the End of The Century: 100 Years of Architecture, Museum of Contemporary Art, Tokyo Japan, 1998; El Antiguo Colegio de San Ildefonso, Mexico, Nov 1998; Museum of Contemporary Art, Los Angeles, April–September 2000
- Hodgetts + Fung, Otis Art Gallery, Otis College of Art and Design, Los Angeles, CA, 1999. An exhibition of models and design drawings
- Equal Partners: Men & Women Principals in Contemporary Architectural Practice, Smith College Museum of Art, Northampton, MA, 1998
- Angels and Franciscans, Leo Castelli / Gagosian Gallery, New York, NY 1992; Santa Monica Museum of Art, Los Angeles, CA 1993
- Conceptual Drawings by Architects, Bryce Bannatyne Gallery, Los Angeles, CA, 1991
- Visionary San Francisco, San Francisco Museum of Modern Art, San Francisco, CA 1990
- Franklin/La Brea Low Income Housing, Museum of Contemporary Art, Los Angeles, CA, 1989
- Arts Park L.A, Artspace Gallery, Woodland Hills, CA, 1989
- Buenos Aires Arquitectura Biennial, National Museum of Fine Arts, Buenos Aires, Argentina, 1987

== Awards ==
=== Firm ===
- Firm of the Year Award, American Institute of Architects, California Council 2008
- Educator of the Year (Craig Hodgetts), American Institute of Architects, Los Angeles 2004
- Chrysler Design Award, Chrysler Corporation 1996
- 20 Stars of Design, Pacific Design Center 1995
- Architecture Award, American Academy of Arts and Letters 1994
- THE I.D. FORTY, The International Design Magazine 1994
- Graham Foundation Grant, (Hsinming Fung) Graham Foundation, 1992

=== Projects ===
- LAUSD Building Blocks, Next LA Citation Award, American Institute of Architects, Los Angeles 2013
- CalArts WildBeast Pavilion, Merit Award for Architecture, American Institute of Architects, California Council 2013
- LAUSD Building Blocks, R+D Design Award - Prefabricated Prototype, Architect Magazine 2012
- California Design: 1935-1960: Living in a Modern Way, Interior Architecture Award, Los Angeles Business Council Architecture Awards 2012
- Menlo-Atherton Performing Arts Center, Citation Award, American Institute of Architects, Los Angeles 2010
- Donna-Rio Bravo Land Port of Entry, Design Excellence Award, U.S. General Services Administration Design Awards 2008
- Los Angeles Public Library, Mariam Matthews Branch, Hyde Park, Citation Award, American Institute of Architects Los Angeles 2008
- Ira Gershwin Gallery in the Walt Disney Concert Hall, Civic Architecture Award, Los Angeles Business Council Awards 2004
- Los Angeles Public Library, Sylmar Branch, Architectural Design Excellence Award, City of Los Angeles 2001
- American Cinematheque at the Egyptian Theater, Honor Award, American Institute of Architects California Council 1999
- UCLA Temporary Powell (Towell) Library, Award of Excellence, American Institute of Architects / American Library Association 1993

== Publications ==
=== Monographs ===
- Hodgetts + Fung : Scenarios and Spaces, Introduction by Kurt W. Forster, Rizzoli International Publications, 1997.
- Hodgetts + Fung : Series of Contemporary Architects Studio Report in the United States, China Architecture & Building Press, edited by Bruce Q. Lan, 2005.

=== Publications ===
- LA [TEN]: Interviews on Los Angeles Architecture 1970s – 1990s, Lars Muller Publishers, Stephen Phillips, 2013.
- Overdrive: L.A. Constructs the Future, 1940-1990, Getty Publications, Wim de Wit and Christopher James Alexander, 2013.
- A New Sculpturalism: Contemporary Architecture from Southern California, Museum of Contemporary Art, Rizzoli International Publications, Christopher Mount, Inc. 2013.
- A Confederacy of Heretics, J. Paul Getty Museum, Todd Gannon and Ewan Branda, 2013.
- Architecture Now! 8, Taschen, 2012.
- In Honor of Libraries Named for African Americans, GrantHouse Publishers, 2011.
- Utopia Forever Visions of Architecture and Urbanism, Gestalten Press, 2011.
- Installations by Architects: Experiments in Building and Design, Princeton Architectural Press, Sarah Bonnemaison and Ronit Eisenbach, 2009.
