= The Hurt Locker =

2008 film by Kathryn Bigelow

- Theatrical release poster
- Directed by: Kathryn Bigelow
- Written by: Mark Boal
- Produced by: Kathryn Bigelow; Mark Boal; Nicolas Chartier; Greg Shapiro
- Starring: Jeremy Renner; Anthony Mackie; Brian Geraghty; Evangeline Lilly; Ralph Fiennes; David Morse; Guy Pearce
- Cinematography: Barry Ackroyd
- Edited by: Chris Innis; Bob Murawski
- Music by: Marco Beltrami; Buck Sanders
- Production companies: Voltage Pictures; Grosvenor Park Productions; First Light; Kingsgate Films
- Distributed by: Summit Entertainment
- Release dates: September 4, 2008 (Venice); June 26, 2009 (United States)
- Running time: 130 minutes
- Country: United States
- Language: English
- Budget: $15 million
- Box office: $49.9 million

The Hurt Locker is a 2008 American war film directed by Kathryn Bigelow and written by Mark Boal. It stars Jeremy Renner, Anthony Mackie, Brian Geraghty, Evangeline Lilly, Ralph Fiennes, David Morse, and Guy Pearce. It follows an Iraq War bomb disposal team who are targeted by insurgents and shows their psychological reactions to the stress of combat. Boal drew on his experience during embedded access to write the screenplay.

The Hurt Locker premiered at the 2008 Venice International Film Festival and was released in the United States on June 26, 2009, by Summit Entertainment. It received acclaim from critics, who praised the acting and cinematography. It was nominated for nine Academy Awards and won six, including Best Director and Best Original Screenplay, and became the first film directed by a woman to win Best Picture. It grossed $50 million worldwide.

The Hurt Locker is considered one of the most influential war films of the 2000s and the 21st century. In 2020, it was selected for preservation in the United States National Film Registry by the Library of Congress as "culturally, historically, or aesthetically significant".

Notwithstanding its popular appeal, the film has been criticised by Iraq War veterans as "absurd" and "nonsensical".

== Plot ==
During the second year of the Iraq War, a U.S. Army Explosive Ordnance Disposal team with Bravo Company identifies and attempts to destroy an improvised explosive device (IED) with a robot, but the wagon carrying the trigger charge breaks. Team leader Staff Sergeant Matthew Thompson places the charge by hand, but is killed when an Iraqi insurgent uses a cell phone to detonate the IED. Squadmate Specialist Owen Eldridge feels guilty for failing to kill the man with the phone.

Sergeant First Class William James replaces Thompson. He is often at odds with Sergeant J. T. Sanborn because he prefers to defuse devices by hand and does not communicate his plans. He blocks Sanborn's view with smoke grenades as he approaches an IED and defuses it only moments before an Iraqi insurgent attempts to detonate it with a 9-volt battery. In another incident, James insists on disarming a complex car bomb despite Sanborn's protests that it is taking too long; James responds by taking off his headset and flipping off Sanborn. Sanborn is so worried by his conduct that he openly suggests fragging James to Eldridge while they are exploding unused ordnance outside of base.

On their return to base, they encounter five armed men in Iraqi garb by an SUV which has a flat tire. After a tense encounter, James learns they are friendly British private military contractors. While fixing the tire, they come under sniper fire. Three of the contractors are killed before James and Sanborn take over counter-sniping, killing three insurgents. Eldridge kills the fourth who attempts to flank their position.

During a raid on a warehouse, James discovers a "body bomb" he believes is Beckham, an Iraqi boy who sells DVDs and plays soccer outside of base. During the evacuation, Lieutenant Colonel John Cambridge, the camp's psychiatrist and Eldridge's counselor, is killed in an explosion; Eldridge is further traumatized. James sneaks off base with Beckham's apparent associate at gunpoint, telling him to take him to Beckham's home. He is left at the home of an unrelated Iraqi professor, and James flees.

Called to a tanker truck detonation, James decides to hunt for the insurgents responsible nearby. Sanborn protests, but when James begins a pursuit, he and Eldridge follow. After they split up, insurgents capture Eldridge. James and Sanborn rescue him, although Eldridge is shot in the leg. The following morning, James is approached by Beckham, alive and well, whom James ignores and walks by silently. Before being airlifted for surgery, Eldridge angrily blames James for his wound.

The day before their deployment ends, they are called to disarm a bomb vest strapped to a man against his will. James cannot cut the locks off before the timer expires, and they are forced to abandon the man. Sanborn is distraught at the near-death experience, and lamenting that no one other than his parents would have been sad at his death, tells James that he wishes to leave the service in order to have a son.

After Bravo Company's rotation ends, James returns to his ex-wife Connie and their infant son. However, he is unfulfilled by routine civilian life at home. James confesses to his son there is only one thing he knows he loves. He starts another year-long tour of duty with Delta Company.

== Cast ==
- Jeremy Renner as Sergeant First Class William James
- Anthony Mackie as Sergeant J. T. Sanborn
- Brian Geraghty as Specialist Owen Eldridge
- Guy Pearce as Staff Sergeant Matthew Thompson
- Christian Camargo as Lieutenant Colonel John Cambridge
- David Morse as Colonel Reed
- Ralph Fiennes as the leader of a Private Military Company unit
- Evangeline Lilly as Connie James
- Christopher Sayegh as Beckham
- Malcolm Barrett as Sergeant Foster
- Sam Spruell as Contractor Charlie
- Suhail Dabbach as a man forced to wear a bomb vest

== Production ==
The small-budget film was independently produced and directed by Kathryn Bigelow. The screenplay was written by Mark Boal, a freelance writer who was embedded as a journalist in 2004 with a U.S. Army EOD team in Iraq.

The film premiered at the Venice Film Festival in Italy during 2008. After being shown at the Toronto International Film Festival, it was picked up for distribution in the United States by Summit Entertainment. In May 2009, it was the Closing Night selection for Maryland Film Festival. The film was released in the United States on June 26, 2009, but received a more widespread theatrical release on July 24, 2009.

The film was nominated for nine Oscars at the 82nd Academy Awards in 2010, although the film had not yet recovered its budget by the time of the ceremony. It won six Oscars, including Best Picture, Best Director for Bigelow (the first woman to win this award), and Best Original Screenplay for Boal.

=== Writing ===
The Hurt Locker is based on accounts of Mark Boal, a freelance journalist who was embedded with an American bomb squad in the war in Iraq for two weeks in 2004. In 2005, Boal pitched a film based on his Playboy article "The Man in the Bomb Suit" to director Kathryn Bigelow. Director Bigelow was familiar with Boal's work before his experiences, having adapted one of his other Playboy articles as the short-lived television series The Inside in 2002. When Boal was embedded with the squad, he accompanied its members 10 to 15 times a day to watch their tasks, and kept in touch with Bigelow via email about his experiences. Boal used his experiences as the basis of a fictional drama based on real events.

He said of the film's goal, "The idea is that it's the first movie about the Iraq War that purports to show the experience of the soldiers. We wanted to show the kinds of things that soldiers go through that you can't see on CNN, and I don't mean that in a censorship-conspiracy way. I just mean the news doesn't actually put photographers in with units that are this elite." Bigelow was fascinated with exploring "the psychology behind the type of soldier who volunteers for this particular conflict and then, because of [their] aptitude, is chosen and given the opportunity to go into bomb disarmament and goes toward what everybody else is running from." Bigelow and Boal subsequently decided to avoid "polemics" about the conflict itself in order to focus on suspense.

While working with Boal in 2005 on the script, originally titled The Something Jacket, Bigelow began to do some preliminary, rough storyboards to get an idea of the specific location needed. Bomb disarmament protocol requires a containment area. She wanted to make the film as authentic as possible and "put the audience into the Humvee, into a boots-on-the-ground experience."

Most major studios were uninterested in producing the screenplay because Bigelow's previous film K-19: The Widowmaker (2002) had been a box-office bomb and because Iraq War films tended to be unprofitable. Nicolas Chertier finally greenlit the film at Voltage Pictures with a $30 million budget.

=== Casting ===
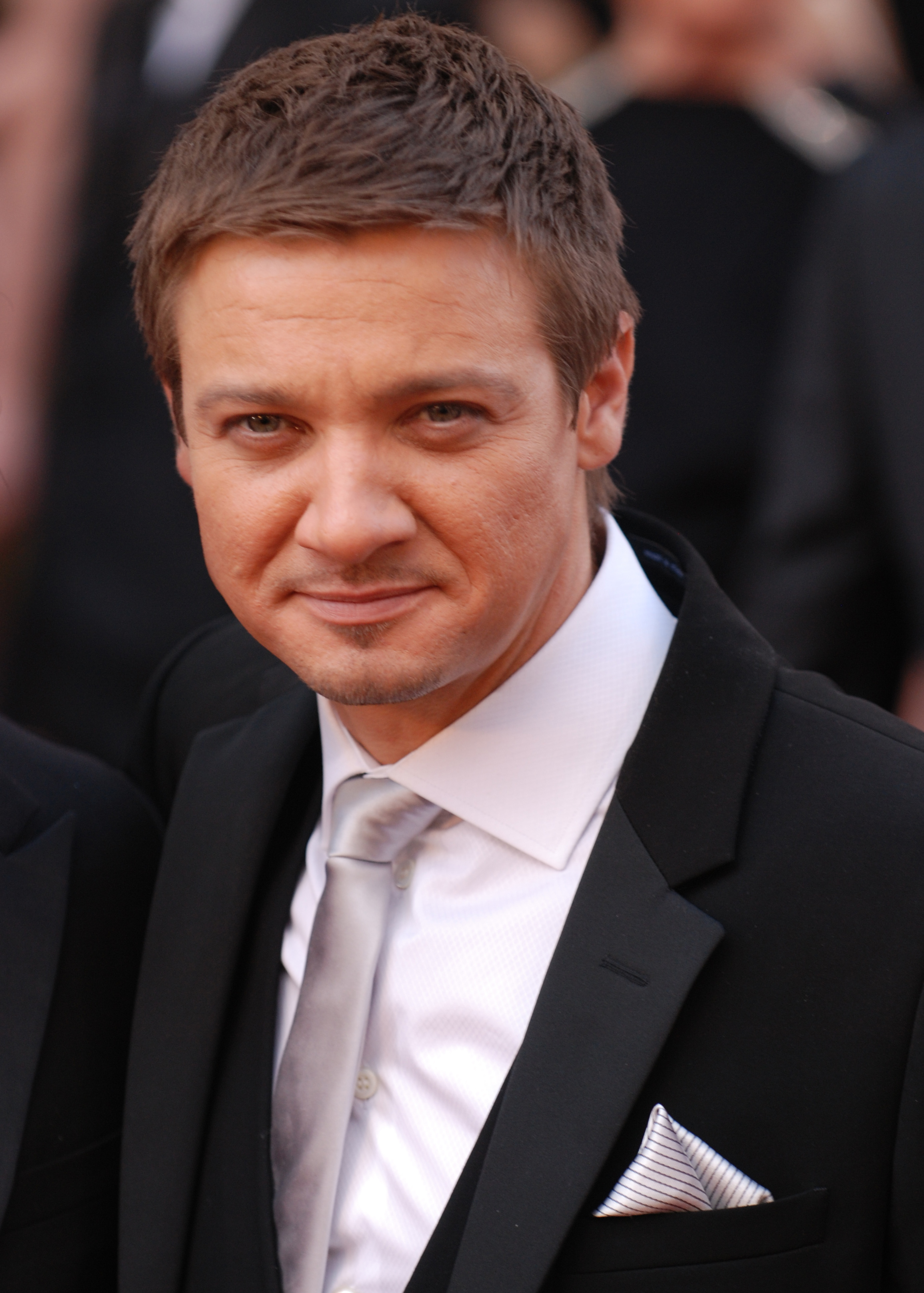
Jeremy Renner

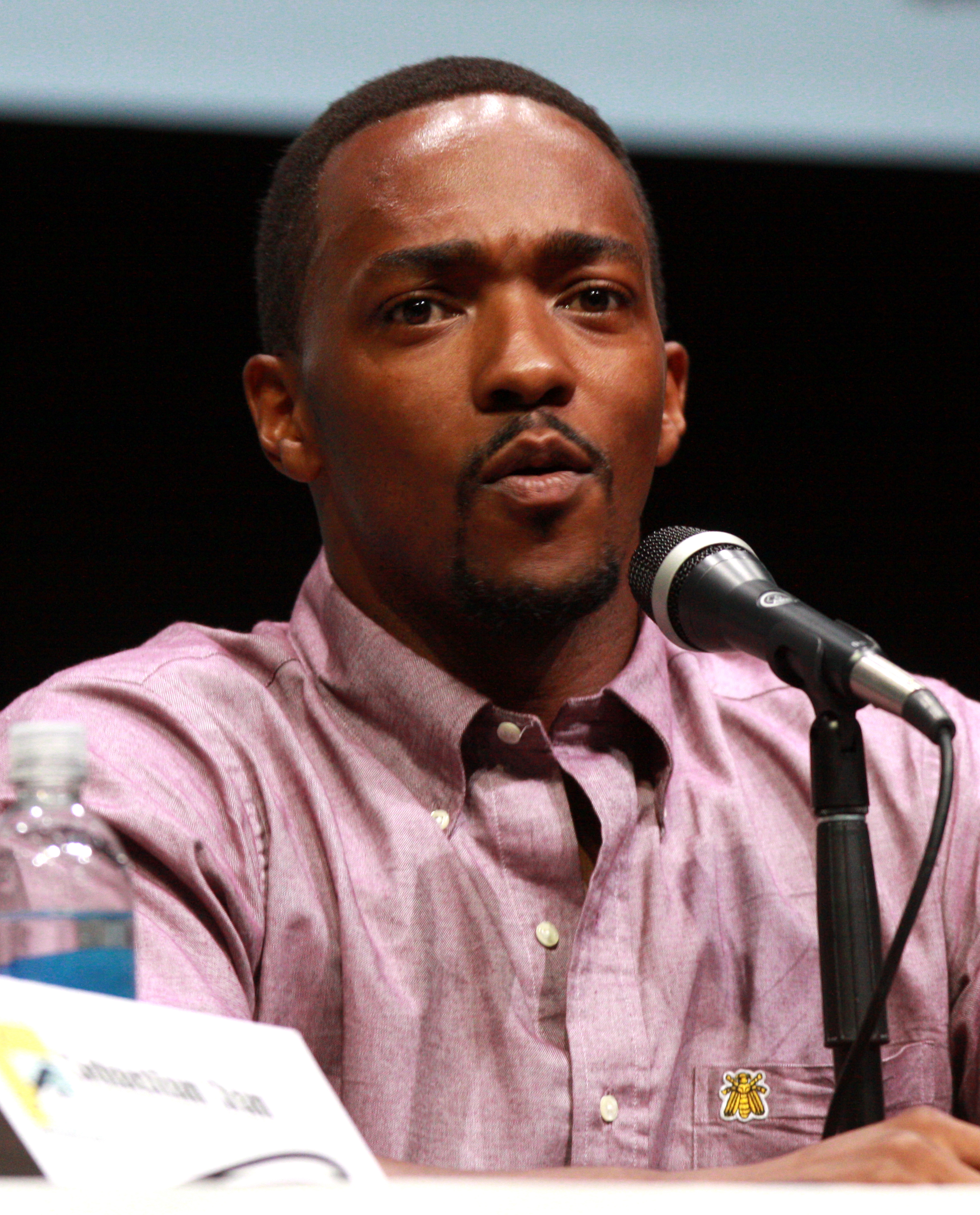
Anthony Mackie

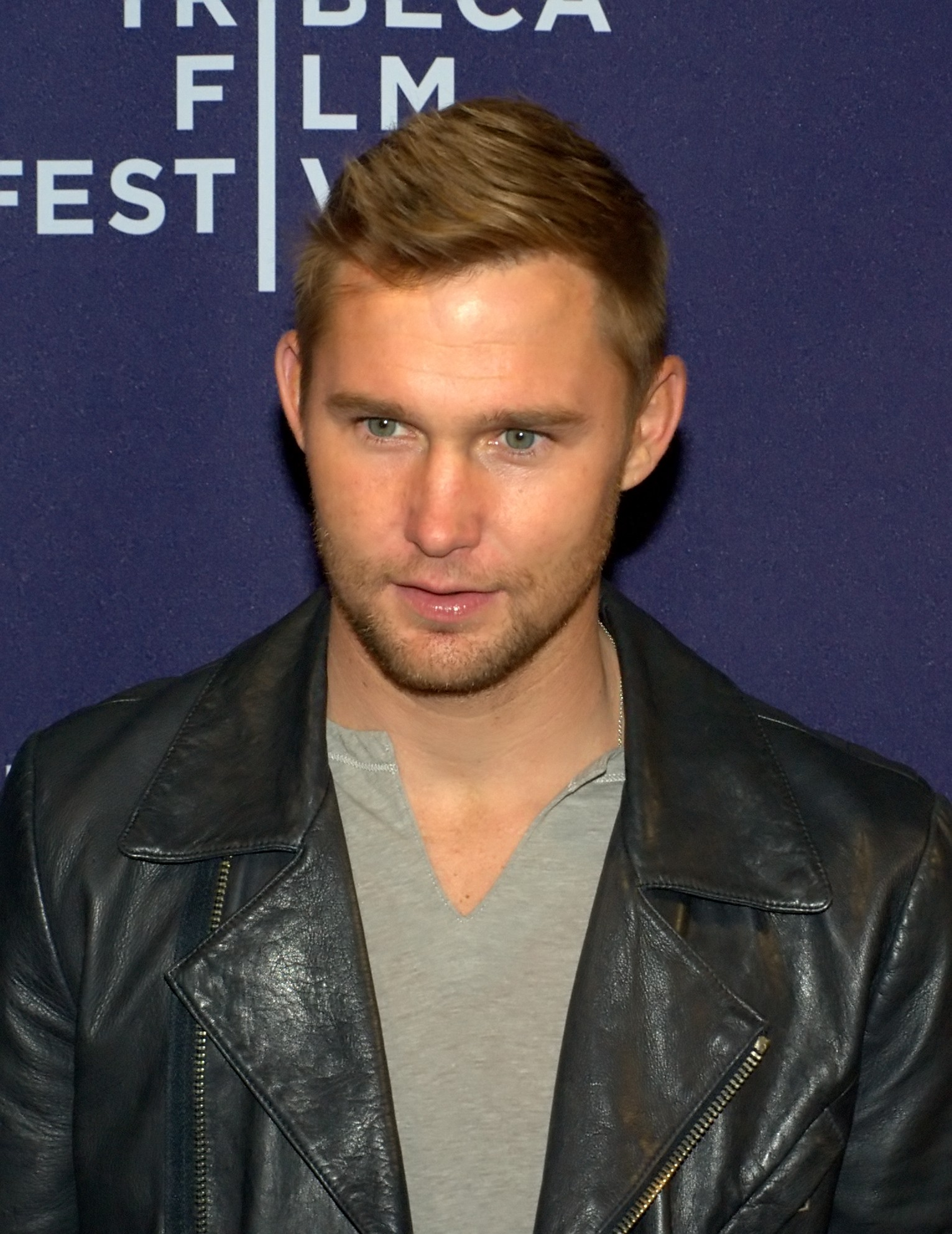
Brian Geraghty

For the main characters, Bigelow made a point of casting relatively unknown actors: "it underscored the tension because with the lack of familiarity also comes a sense of unpredictability." Renner's character, Staff Sergeant William James, is a composite character, with qualities based on individuals whom screenwriter Boal knew when embedded with the bomb squad. Bigelow cast Renner based on his work in Dahmer, a film about Jeffrey Dahmer, the notorious serial killer whose victims were boys. To prepare for the film, the cast spent a week living and training at Fort Irwin, a United States Army reservation in the Mojave Desert in California. They were taught to use C4 explosives, learned how to render safe improvised explosive devices, and how to wear a bomb suit.

Mackie plays Sergeant J. T. Sanborn. Describing the experience of filming in Jordan in the summer, he said, "It was so desperately hot, and we were so easily agitated. But that movie was like doing a play. We really looked out for each other, and it was a great experience. It made me believe in film."

Several hundred thousand Iraqi refugees live in Jordan. Bigelow cast refugees who had theatrical backgrounds, such as Suhail Dabbach who plays the innocent man used as a suicide bomber at the film's end.

=== Filming ===
The film was shot in Jordan, within miles of the Iraqi border, to achieve Bigelow's goal of authenticity. Iraqi refugees were used for extras and the cast worked in the intense heat of the Middle East. Bigelow had wanted to film in Iraq, but the production security team could not guarantee their safety from Iraqi insurgents. The filmmakers had scouted for locations in Morocco, which Chertier preferred due to its cheaper cost but which Bigelow felt did not resemble Iraq closely enough. Boal's contacts in the Central Intelligence Agency suggested Jordan because its capital city of Amman strongly resembled Baghdad and because the Jordanian royal family was very supportive of Western film productions. The Jordanian government, which was trying to start a domestic film industry, would indeed be very generous towards the film. It offered discounted shipping rates and even helped fund the film when its bond was nearly withdrawn after a line producer quit in the first three weeks of filming. This assistance allowed Bigelow to cut the budget to just $15 million. Jordan also used the making of the movie to found a film school and an internship program. In addition, Bigelow wanted to get as close to the war zone as possible. Some of the locations were less than three miles from the Iraqi border, and were within a few miles of active conflict zones in Iraq itself.

The production also initially had permission from the United States Department of Defense's film liaison unit to film at a real United States Army logistics base in Camp Arifjan, Kuwait. However, the filming clearance was withdrawn because military officials believed new scenes which were not in the approved screenplay were being shot. After the U.S. Department of Defense suspended cooperation with the film, it used Royal Jordanian Army equipment instead.

Principal photography began in July 2007 in Jordan. Temperatures averaged 120 °F (49 °C) over the 44 days of shooting. The actors were housed in a tent with dirt floors and encouraged to method act. Often four or more camera crews filmed simultaneously, which resulted in nearly 200 hours of footage. The producer Greg Shapiro spoke about security concerns of filming in Jordan, "It was interesting telling people we were going to make the movie in Jordan because the first question everybody asked was about the security situation here."

Bigelow's choice to film in Jordan met some resistance. In discussion, she found that her cast and crew shared stereotypes of the region from American culture. "Sadly people in America and Los Angeles have these perceptions", she said. "But once you get off the plane you realize it's like Manhattan without the trees", she continued. As Iraq dominated discourse in America and around the world, Bigelow believed that filmmakers would continue to explore the conflict, making Jordan the natural place to film.

According to producer Tony Mark, the blood, sweat and heat captured on-camera in the production was mirrored behind the scenes.

"It's a tough, tough movie about a tough, tough subject", Mark said in an interview, "There was a palpable tension throughout on the set. It was just like the onscreen story of three guys who fight with each other, but when the time comes to do the work, they come together to get the job done."

Renner remembered, "I got food bugs. Then I got food poisoning: lost 15 lbs in three days". In addition to the burden of the heat, the bomb suit he had to wear all day weighed 80–100 lb (36–45 kg). In a scene in which his character carries a dead Iraqi boy, Renner fell down some stairs and twisted his ankle, which delayed filming because he could not walk. At that point, "people wanted to quit. All the departments were struggling to get their job done, none of them were communicating". A week later, filming resumed.

Tony Mark recalled the armorer David Fencl's finishing a 12-hour day. He found he had to stay up all night to make proper ammunition for a sniper rifle, as the supplies did not clear Jordanian customs in time for the scheduled shoot. Due to import restrictions on military props, the film's special effects artist Richard Stutsman used Chinese fireworks for gunpowder. One day, he was assembling a prop, and the heat and friction caused the fireworks to blow up in his face. Two days later, he returned to work. The film shoot had few of the normal Hollywood perks; nobody on the set got an air-conditioned trailer or a private bathroom. Renner said that great care was taken to ensure the film's authenticity. According to Renner, shooting the film in the Middle East contributed to this. "There were two-by-fours with nails being dropped from two-story buildings that hit me in the helmet, and they were throwing rocks.... We got shot at a few times while we were filming", Renner said. "When you see it, you're gonna feel like you've been in war."

"You can't fake that amount of heat", Mackie says, adding, "When you are on set and all of the extras are Iraqi refugees, it really informs the movie that you're making. When you start hearing the stories from a true perspective ... of people who were actually there, it gives you a clear viewpoint of where you are as an artist and the story you would like to tell. It was a great experience to be there."

=== Cinematography ===
For the film, director Bigelow sought to immerse audiences "into something that was raw, immediate and visceral". Impressed with cinematographer Barry Ackroyd's work on United 93 and The Wind That Shakes the Barley, Bigelow invited him to work on her film. While the film was independently produced and filmed on a low budget, Bigelow used four Super 16 mm cameras to capture multiple perspectives, saying,

"That's how we experience reality, by looking at the microcosm and the macrocosm simultaneously. The eye sees differently than the lens, but with multiple focal lengths and a muscular editorial style, the lens can give you that microcosm/macrocosm perspective and that contributes to the feeling of total immersion."

In staging the film's action sequences, Bigelow did not want to lose a sense of the geography and used multiple cameras to allow her to "look at any particular set-piece from every possible perspective."

=== Editing ===
The Hurt Locker was edited by Chris Innis and Bob Murawski. The two editors worked with almost 200 hours of footage from the multiple hand-held cameras in use during the shoot. Adding to the challenge, Boal's screenplay had a non-traditional, asymmetrical, episodic structure. There was no traditional "villain", and tension was derived from the characters' internal conflicts and the suspense from the explosives and snipers.

"This movie is kind of like a horror film where you're unable to see the killer," says Innis. "You know a bomb could go off at any minute, but you never know just when it's going to happen, so the ideas of [Alfred] Hitchcock—about making your audience anxious—were influential for us when we did the editing."

The raw footage was described as a "hodge-podge of disconnected, nausea-inducing motion that was constantly crossing the 180-degree line".

Innis spent the first eight weeks editing the film on location in Jordan, before returning to Los Angeles, where Murawski joined her. The process took over eight months to complete. The goal was to edit a brutally realistic portrayal of the realities of war, using minimal special effects or technical enhancement. Innis stated that they "really wanted the film to retain that 'newsreel' documentary quality... Too many stage-y effects would have been distracting. The editing in this film was all about restraint".

Editing on location led to additional complications in post-production. The production was unwilling to risk sending undeveloped film through high-security airports where the cans could be opened, X-rayed, or damaged. Accordingly, film was hand-carried on a flight by a production assistant from Amman to London. After the Super 16mm film was transferred to DVcam at a lab in London, the video dailies were transported by plane back to the Middle East to be imported into the editing system. The whole journey would take anywhere from three days to a week and was described by Innis as the "modern-day equivalent of shipping via donkey cart." The low production budget and the lack of a developed film infrastructure in the area hampered the process, according to Innis. "We were working with grainy Super 16mm film, editing in standard definition. We tried doing FTP downloads, but at the time, the facilities in Jordan simply couldn't handle it." Producer Tony Mark later negotiated the use of a local radio station late at night to receive low-grade QuickTime clips over the Internet so the crew would not be shooting blindly.

=== Musical score and sound ===
Marco Beltrami and Buck Sanders composed the score. Bigelow wanted Beltrami to score for the film, as she liked his critically acclaimed work in 3:10 to Yuma (2007). Paul N. J. Ottosson worked on the film's sound design. The score was released in June 2009 through Lakeshore Records.

== Release ==
=== Festival screenings ===
The Hurt Locker had its world premiere at the Venice International Film Festival on September 4, 2008, and the film received a 10-minute standing ovation at the end of its screening. At the festival, the film won the SIGNIS award, the Arca Cinemagiovani Award (Arca Young Cinema Award) for "Best Film Venezia 65" (chosen by an international youth jury); the Human Rights Film Network Award; and the Venezia Cinema Award known as the "Navicella". The film also screened at the 33rd Annual Toronto International Film Festival on September 8, where it generated "keen interest", though distributors were reluctant to buy it since previous films about the Iraq War performed poorly at the box office. Summit Entertainment purchased the film for distribution in the United States in what was perceived as "a skittish climate for pic sales".

In the rest of 2008, The Hurt Locker screened at the 3rd Zurich Film Festival, the 37th Festival du Nouveau Cinéma, the 21st Mar del Plata Film Festival, the 5th Dubai International Film Festival, and the 12th Tallinn Black Nights Film Festival. In 2009, The Hurt Locker screened at the Göteborg International Film Festival, the 10th Film Comment Selects festival, and the South by Southwest film festival. It was the closing night film at Maryland Film Festival 2009, with Bigelow presenting. It had a centerpiece screening at the 3rd AFI Dallas International Film Festival, where director Kathryn Bigelow received the Dallas Star Award. Other 2009 festivals included the Human Rights Nights International Film Festival, the Seattle International Film Festival, and the Philadelphia Film Festival.

=== Theatrical run ===
The Hurt Locker was first publicly released in Italy by Warner Bros. on October 10, 2008. Summit Entertainment picked the film up for distribution in the United States for $1.5 million after it was shown at the Toronto International Film Festival. The Hurt Locker was released in the United States on June 26, 2009, with a limited release at four theaters in Los Angeles and New York City. Over its first weekend the film grossed $145,352, averaging $36,338 per theater. The following weekend, beginning July 3, the film grossed $131,202 at nine theaters, averaging $14,578 per theater. It held the highest per-screen average of any film playing theatrically in the United States for the first two weeks of its release, gradually moving into the top 20 chart with much wider-released, bigger budget studio films. It held around number 13 or number 14 on box office charts for an additional four weeks. Summit Entertainment took The Hurt Locker wider to more than 200 screens on July 24, 2009, and more than 500 screens on July 31, 2009.

The film's final gross was $17 million in the United States and Canada (currently it is a lowest-grossing film domestically to have ever won a Best Picture at The Academy Awards), and $32.9 in other countries, bringing its worldwide total to $49.9 million. It was a success against its budget of $15 million.

According to the Los Angeles Times, The Hurt Locker performed better than most recent dramas about Middle East conflict. The film outperformed all other Iraq-war-themed films such as In the Valley of Elah (2007), Stop-Loss (2008) and Afghanistan-themed Lions for Lambs (2007).

In the United States, The Hurt Locker is one of only five Best Picture winners (The English Patient, Amadeus, The Artist, and The Shape of Water being the other four) to never enter the weekend box office top 5 since top 10 rankings were first recorded in 1982. It is also one of the only two Best Picture winners on record never to have entered the weekend box office top 10 (The Artist being the other).

The Hurt Locker opened in the top ten in the United Kingdom in 103 theaters, scoring the fourth-highest per-screen average of $3,607, ranking between G-Force and G.I. Joe in overall grosses. The film garnered half a million dollars in its opening weekend in the United Kingdom of August 28 through August 30, 2009, and grossed over a million dollars in the UK, Japan, Spain, and France through March.

=== Distribution: Independent film print shortage ===
According to an article in the Springfield, Illinois State Journal-Register, as of August 2009, there was a shortage of film prints of The Hurt Locker, as well as other hit independent films such as Food, Inc. Distributors told theater owners that they would have to wait weeks or months past the initial U.S. release date to get the few available prints that were already in distribution. "Sometimes the distributors goof up," said a film buyer for one theater. "They misjudge how wide they should go." One theory is that the independent films have a hard time competing for screen space during the summer against blockbuster tent-pole films that take up as much as half the screens in any given city, flooding the United States market with thousands of prints. Theater owners have also complained about distributors "bunching too many movies too close together". It is also thought that independent film distributors are trying to cut their losses on prints by recycling them. Given the popularity of some of the films that are "hard to come by", this strategy may be leaving box office money on the table.

=== Home media ===
The Hurt Locker was released on DVD and Blu-ray in North America on January 12, 2010. This disc includes an added audio commentary featuring director Kathryn Bigelow, writer Mark Boal, and other members of the production crew; an image gallery of photos from shooting; and a 15-minute EPK featurette highlighting the filming experience in Jordan and the film's production. The UK DVD and Blu-ray have no commentary.

On February 22, 2022, two years after getting a digital 4K release, Lionsgate and Best Buy released a steelbook of the movie, marking the first time it came to 4K resolution. U.S. sales of the DVD topped $30 million by mid-August 2010.

== Reception ==
=== Critical response ===
The Hurt Locker received critical acclaim. Rotten Tomatoes gives the film an approval rating of 96%, based on 288 reviews, with a weighted average rating of 8.5/10. It was the second highest-rated film of 2009, behind Pixar's Up. The critics' consensus reads, "A well-acted, intensely shot, action filled war epic, Kathryn Bigelow's The Hurt Locker is thus far the best of the recent dramatizations of the Iraq War." Metacritic, which assigns a normalized score, gave the film an average score of 95 out of 100, based on 37 critics, indicating "universal acclaim".

Roger Ebert of The Chicago Sun Times rated the film as the best of 2009, writing, "The Hurt Locker is a great film, an intelligent film, a film shot clearly so that we know exactly who everybody is and where they are and what they're doing and why." He applauded how the suspense was built, calling the film "spellbinding". Ebert considered Renner "a leading contender for Academy Awards", writing, "His performance is not built on complex speeches but on a visceral projection of who this man is and what he feels. He is not a hero in a conventional sense." He eventually ranked it the second-best film of the decade, behind only Synecdoche, New York.

Richard Corliss of Time also praised Renner's performance, calling it a highlight of the film. He wrote,

He's ordinary, pudgy-faced, quiet, and at first seems to lack the screen charisma to carry a film. That supposition vanishes in a few minutes, as Renner slowly reveals the strength, confidence and unpredictability of a young Russell Crowe. The merging of actor and character is one of the big things to love about this movie... It's a creepy marvel to watch James in action. He has the cool aplomb, analytical acumen and attention to detail of a great athlete, or a master psychopath, maybe both.

Corliss praised the "steely calm" tone, reflective of its main character. He wrote, "The Hurt Locker is a near-perfect movie about men in war, men at work. Through sturdy imagery and violent action, it says that even Hell needs heroes."

A. O. Scott of The New York Times called The Hurt Locker the best American feature film yet made about the war in Iraq:

You may emerge from The Hurt Locker shaken, exhilarated and drained, but you will also be thinking ... The movie is a viscerally exciting, adrenaline-soaked tour de force of suspense and surprise, full of explosions and hectic scenes of combat, but it blows a hole in the condescending assumption that such effects are just empty spectacle or mindless noise.

Scott noticed that the film reserved criticism of the war but wrote of how the director handled the film's limits, "Ms. Bigelow, practicing a kind of hyperbolic realism, distills the psychological essence and moral complications of modern warfare into a series of brilliant, agonizing set pieces." He also applauded the convergence of the characters in the film, saying that it "focuses on three men whose contrasting temperaments knit this episodic exploration of peril and bravery into a coherent and satisfying story." Kenneth Turan of the Los Angeles Times wrote that the performances of Renner, Mackie, and Geraghty would raise their profiles considerably, and said their characters reveal their "unlooked-for aspects," such as Renner's character being playful with an Iraqi boy. Turan applauded Boal's "lean and compelling" script and said of Bigelow's direction, "Bigelow and her team bring an awesome ferocity to re-creating the unhinged mania of bomb removal in an alien, culturally unfathomable atmosphere."

Guy Westwell of Sight & Sound wrote that the cinematographer Barry Ackroyd provided "sharp handheld coverage" and that Paul N. J. Ottosson's sound design "uses the barely perceptible ringing of tinnitus to amp up the tension." Westwell praised the director's skill:

The careful mapping of the subtle differences between each bomb, the play with point of view ... and the attenuation of key action sequences ... lends the film a distinctive quality that can only be attributed to Bigelow's clever, confident direction.

The critic noted the film's different take on the Iraq War, writing that "it confronts the fact that men often take great pleasure in war." He concluded,

This unapologetic celebration of a testosterone-fuelled lust for war may gall. Yet there is something original and distinctive about the film's willingness to admit that for some men (and many moviegoers) war carries an intrinsic dramatic charge.

Amy Taubin of Film Comment described The Hurt Locker as "a structuralist war movie" and "a totally immersive, off-the-charts high-anxiety experience from beginning to end." Taubin praised Ackroyd's "brilliant" cinematography with multiple viewpoints. She said of the film's editing, "Bob Murawski and Chris Innis's editing is similarly quick and nervous; the rapid changes in POV as they cut from one camera's coverage to another's, makes you feel as if you, like the characters, are under threat from all sides."

Joe Morgenstern of The Wall Street Journal called it "A first-rate action thriller, a vivid evocation of urban warfare in Iraq, a penetrating study of heroism and a showcase for austere technique, terse writing and a trio of brilliant performances." The Toronto Star critic Peter Howell said, "Just when you think the battle of Iraq war dramas has been fought and lost, along comes one that demands to be seen... If you can sit through The Hurt Locker without your heart nearly pounding through your chest, you must be made of granite." Entertainment Weekly's film critic Lisa Schwarzbaum gave the film the rare "A" rating, calling it, "an intense, action-driven war pic, a muscular, efficient standout that simultaneously conveys the feeling of combat from within as well as what it looks like on the ground. This ain't no war videogame."

Derek Elley of Variety found The Hurt Locker to be "gripping" as a thriller but felt that the film was weakened by, "its fuzzy (and hardly original) psychology." Elley wrote that it was unclear to know where the drama lay: "These guys get by on old-fashioned guts and instinct rather than sissy hardware—but it's not a pure men-under-stress drama either." The critic also felt that the script showed "signs of artificially straining for character depth." Anne Thompson, also writing for Variety, believed The Hurt Locker to be a contender for Best Picture, particularly based on the unique subject matter pursued by a female director and on being an exception to other films about the Iraq War, which had performed poorly.

Tara McKelvey from The American Prospect wrote that the film is pro-U.S. Army propaganda, although it suggests it is anti-war with the opening statement: "War is a drug." She continues,

You feel empathy for the soldiers when they shoot. And in this way, the full impact of the Iraq war—at least as it was fought in 2004—becomes clear: American soldiers shot at Iraqi civilians even when, for example, they just happened to be holding a cell phone and standing near an IED." She concludes, "For all the graphic violence, bloody explosions and, literally, human butchery that is shown in the film, The Hurt Locker is one of the most effective recruiting vehicles for the U.S. Army that I have seen.

In a 60 Minutes interview, Bigelow referred to the film as "both anti-war and as a tribute to the soldiers who sign up to do this kind of work."

John Pilger, journalist and documentarian, criticized the film in the New Statesman, writing that it "offers a vicarious thrill via yet another standard-issue psychopath high on violence in somebody else's country where the deaths of a million people are consigned to cinematic oblivion."

In 2010, the Independent Film & Television Alliance selected the film as one of the 30 Most Significant Independent Films of the last 30 years.

The Hurt Locker was named the tenth "Best Film of the 21st Century So Far" in 2017 by The New York Times chief film critics A. O. Scott and Manohla Dargis. Filmmaker Michael Mann also cited it as one of his favorite films. In June 2025, it ranked number 68 on The New York Times' list of "The 100 Best Movies of the 21st Century" and was one of the films voted for the "Readers' Choice" edition of the list, finishing at number 249. In July 2025, it ranked number 94 on Rolling Stone's list of "The 100 Best Movies of the 21st Century."

Media Historian Prof Stuart Ewen criticised in the movie what he described as “a complete celebration of a lone lunatic, but who ultimately is the quintessential American Hero, because lone lunatics are very big in this country”.

=== Response among veterans ===
The film was criticized by some Iraq veterans and embedded reporters for inaccurately portraying wartime conditions. Writing for The Huffington Post, Iraq veteran Kate Hoit said that The Hurt Locker is "Hollywood's version of the Iraq war and of the soldiers who fight it, and their version is inaccurate." She described the film as being "better than a lot of the recent war movies that have been released" but expressed concerns that several errors—among them wrong uniforms, lack of radio communication, or misbehavior of the soldiers—would alienate service members from enjoying the film.

Author Brandon Friedman, also a combat veteran of Iraq and Afghanistan, shared a similar view at VetVoice: "The Hurt Locker is a high-tension, well-made, action movie that will certainly keep most viewers on the edges of their seats. But if you know anything about the Army, or about operations or life in Iraq, you'll be so distracted by the nonsensical sequences and plot twists that it will ruin the movie for you. It certainly did for me." Friedman criticized the inaccuracy of the film's representation of combat, saying, "in real life, EOD techs don't conduct dangerous missions as autonomous three-man teams without communications gear ... Another thing you'll rarely hear in combat is an EOD E-7 suggesting to two or three of his guys that they leave the scene of an explosion in an Iraqi city by saying: 'C'mon, let's split up. We can cover more ground that way.'"

At the blog Army of Dude, infantryman and Iraq veteran Alex Horton noted that "the way the team goes about their missions is completely absurd." He still generally enjoyed it and called it "the best Iraq movie to date."

Troy Steward, another combat veteran, wrote on the blog Bouhammer that while the film accurately depicted the scale of bomb violence and the relations between Iraqis and troops, "just about everything else wasn't realistic." Steward went on to say: "I was amazed that a movie so bad could get any kind of accolades from anyone."

A review published March 8, 2010, in the Air Force Times cited overall negative reviews from bomb experts in Iraq attached to the 4th Brigade, 1st Armored Division, quoting a bomb disposal team leader who called the film's portrayal of a bomb expert "grossly exaggerated and not appropriate," and describing the lead character as "more of a run and gun cowboy type … exactly the kind of person that we're not looking for." Another bomb disposal team member said that the lead character's "swagger would put a whole team at risk. Our team leaders don't have that kind of invincibility complex, and if they do, they aren't allowed to operate. A team leader's first priority is getting his team home in one piece."

On the embedded side, former correspondent for Politico and Military Times Christian Lowe (who embedded with U.S. military units each year from 2002 to 2005) explained at DefenseTech: "Some of the scenes are so disconnected with reality to be almost parody."

Former British bomb disposal officer Guy Marot said, "James makes us look like hot-headed, irrational adrenaline junkies with no self-discipline. It’s immensely disrespectful to the many officers who have lost their lives."

On the other hand, Henry Engelhardt, an adjutant with the National Explosive Ordnance Disposal Association having twenty years' experience in bomb defusal, complimented the film's atmosphere and depiction of the difficulties of the job, saying, "Of course, no film is realistic in all its details, but the important things were done very well."

James Clark, editor-in-chief for Task and Purpose, writes that despite the controversies about the movie's realism and exaggerated depiction of the soldiers' conduct, the grocery store scene at the end of the movie accurately captures a universal struggle veterans face when returning to civilian life. He describes the struggle as one where veterans become acclimated to making life-or-death decisions and having every minute planned out for them that making mundane decisions can feel overwhelming and uncomfortable, to the point of feeling lost and adrift. Mark Boal discussed how this scene especially resonated with veterans in a 2012 interview with the Los Angeles Times, where he expresses surprise that the scene struck a chord with so many veterans who related to feeling lost and out of place once returning home.

=== Top ten lists ===
The Hurt Locker was listed on many critics' top ten lists.

- 1st – David Ansen, Newsweek
- 1st – J. Hoberman, The Village Voice
- 1st – Kenneth Turan, Los Angeles Times
- 1st – Claudia Puig, USA Today
- 1st – Lisa Schwarzbaum, Entertainment Weekly
- 1st – Peter Hartlaub, San Francisco Chronicle
- 1st – Ella Taylor, L.A. Weekly
- 1st – Roger Ebert, Chicago Sun-Times
- 1st – Mike Scott, The Times-Picayune
- 1st – Elizabeth Weitzman, New York Daily News
- 1st – Joe Morgenstern, The Wall Street Journal
- 1st – Andrea Gronvall, Chicago Reader
- 1st – David Germain, Associated Press
- 1st – David Denby, The New Yorker
- 1st – Bob Mondello, NPR
- 2nd – A.O. Scott, The New York Times
- 2nd – Mick LaSalle, San Francisco Chronicle
- 2nd – Tasha Robinson, The A.V. Club
- 2nd – Michael Sragow, Baltimore Sun
- 2nd – Rene Rodriguez, Miami Herald
- 2nd – Joe Neumaier, New York Daily News
- 2nd – J. R. Jones, Chicago Reader
- 2nd – Michael Rechtshaffen, Ray Bennett, & Frank Scheck, The Hollywood Reporter
- 3rd – Betsy Sharkey, Los Angeles Times
- 3rd – Christy Lemire, Associated Press
- 3rd – V. A. Musetto, New York Post
- 3rd – David Fear, Time Out New York
- 3rd – Richard Roeper
- 3rd – Stephen Farber, The Hollywood Reporter
- 3rd – Scott Foundas, L.A. Weekly
- 4th – Richard Corliss, Time
- 4th – Ty Burr, Boston Globe
- 4th – Carrie Rickey, Philadelphia Inquirer
- 4th – Liam Lacey, The Globe and Mail
- 4th – Kirk Honeycutt, The Hollywood Reporter
- 5th – Nathan Rabin, The A.V. Club
- 5th – James Berardinelli, Reelviews
- 5th – Michael Phillips, Chicago Tribune
- 5th – Joshua Rothkopf, Time Out New York
- 5th – Marjorie Baumgarten, Austin Chronicle
- 5th – Joe Williams, St. Louis Post-Dispatch
- 6th – Stephen Holden, The New York Times
- 6th – Steven Rea, Philadelphia Inquirer
- 7th – Ty Burr, Boston Globe
- 7th – Marc Savlov, Austin Chronicle
- 9th – Kimberly Jones, Austin Chronicle
- 9th – Owen Gleiberman, Entertainment Weekly
- 10th – Keith Phipps & Scott Tobias, The A.V. Club
- 10th – David Edelstein, New York Magazine
- Top 10 (listed alphabetically) – Manohla Dargis, The New York Times
- Top 10 (listed alphabetically) – Bob Mondello, NPR
- Top 10 (listed alphabetically) – David Denby, The New Yorker
- Top 10 (listed alphabetically) – Dana Stevens, Slate

== Accolades ==
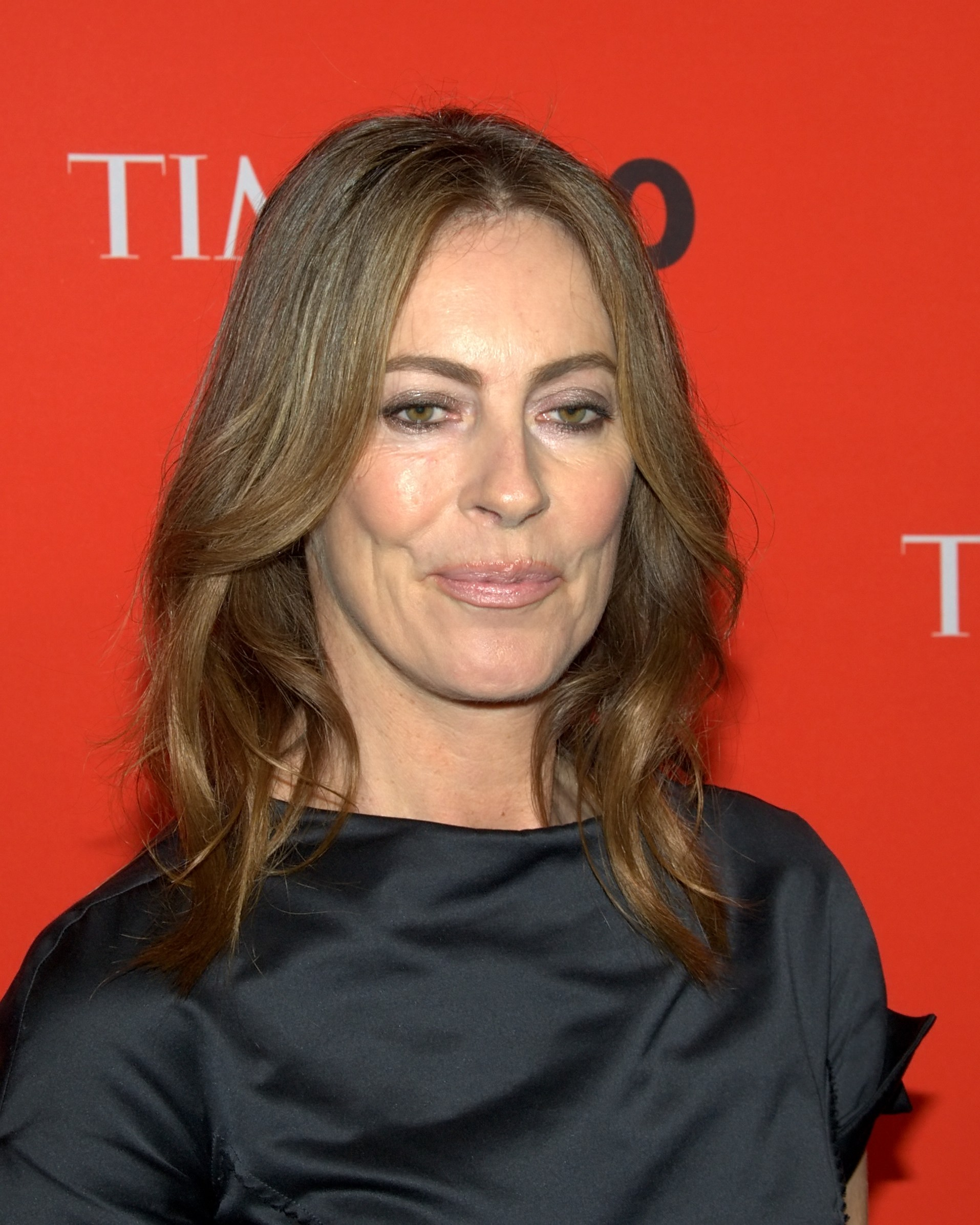
Kathryn Bigelow is the first woman to ever win the Academy Award for Best Director.

Starting with its initial screening at the 2008 Venice International Film Festival, The Hurt Locker has earned many awards and honors. It also ranked on more film critics' top 10 lists than any other film of 2009. It was nominated in nine categories at the 82nd Academy Awards and won in six: Best Picture, Best Director, Best Original Screenplay, Best Sound Editing, Best Sound Mixing, and Best Film Editing. It lost the award for Best Actor to Crazy Heart, Best Original Score to Up, and Best Cinematography to Avatar. Bigelow became the first woman to win an Oscar for Best Director.

Kathryn Bigelow was awarded the Directors Guild of America Award for Outstanding Achievement in Feature Film for the film, being only one of three women to do so along with Chloe Zhao for Nomadland and Jane Campion for The Power of the Dog. The film won six awards at the BAFTAs held on February 21, 2010, including Best Film and Best Director for Bigelow. The Hurt Locker was nominated for three Golden Globe Awards.

The Washington D.C. Area Film Critics Association Award for Best Director was given to Kathryn Bigelow, the first time the honor has gone to a woman. The film swept most critics groups awards for Best Director and Best Picture, including Chicago, Boston, and Las Vegas, Los Angeles, New York' film critics group associations. The Hurt Locker is one of only six films that have won all three major U.S. critics group prizes (LA, NY, NSFC), together with Goodfellas, Schindler's List, L.A. Confidential, The Social Network, and Drive My Car; and also the second to win Best Picture after Schindler's List.

The five awards from the Boston Society of Film Critics were the most by that organization to a single film in the group's 30-year history.

In February 2010, the film's producer Nicolas Chartier emailed a group of Academy Award voters in an attempt to sway them to vote for The Hurt Locker instead of "a $500M film" (referring to Avatar) for the Best Picture award. He later issued a public apology, saying that it was "out of line and not in the spirit of the celebration of cinema that this acknowledgment is". The Academy banned him from attending the award ceremony, the first time the academy has ever banned an individual nominee.

In 2016, the Directors Guild of America ranked the film 56th on its list of The 80 Best-Directed Films since the Guild’s founding in 1936. In 2021, members of Writers Guild of America West (WGAW) and Writers Guild of America, East (WGAE) voted its screenplay 61st in WGA’s 101 Greatest Screenplays of the 21st Century (So Far).

== Lawsuits ==
=== Sarver lawsuit ===
In early March 2010, U.S. Army bomb disposal expert Master Sergeant Jeffrey Sarver filed a multimillion-dollar lawsuit against The Hurt Locker. Sarver's lawsuit claimed he used the term "hurt locker" and the phrase "war is a drug" around Boal, that his likeness was used to create the character William James, and that the portrayal of James defames Sarver. Sarver said he felt "just a little bit hurt, a little bit felt left out" and cheated out of "financial participation" in the film. Sarver claimed he originated the title of the film; however, according to the film's website, the title is a decades-old colloquialism for being injured, as in "they sent him to the hurt locker." It dates back to the Vietnam War where it was one of several phrases meaning "in trouble or at a disadvantage; in bad shape."

Boal defended himself to the press, saying "the film is a work of fiction inspired by many people's stories." He said he talked to more than 100 soldiers during his research. Jody Simon, a Los Angeles-based entertainment lawyer, noted that "soldiers don't have privacy," and that when the military embedded Boal, they gave him full permission to use his observations as he saw fit. Summit Entertainment, the producers of the film, said in early March that they hoped for a quick resolution to the suit. The December 8, 2011, issue of The Hollywood Reporter, reported that the court threw out Sarver's lawsuit. A federal judge ordered him to pay more than $180,000 in attorney fees.

=== Copyright infringement lawsuit ===
On May 12, 2010, Voltage Pictures, the production company behind The Hurt Locker, announced that it would attempt to sue "potentially tens of thousands" of online computer users who downloaded unlicensed copies of the film using the BitTorrent and P2P networks. It would be the largest lawsuit of its kind. On May 28, 2010, it filed a complaint against 5,000 unidentified BitTorrent users in the United States District Court for the District of Columbia; Voltage announced its intention to demand $1,500 from each defendant to release him or her from the suit. Several people, however, refused to settle with the studio. The US Copyright Group (USCG) has since dropped all cases against the alleged Hurt Locker downloaders.

On August 29, 2011, the Federal Court of Canada ordered three Canadian ISPs—Bell Canada, Cogeco, and Vidéotron—to disclose the names and addresses of the subscribers whose IP addresses were suspected of having downloaded a copy of the film. The ISPs were given two weeks to comply with the order.

== Bibliography ==
- Thomson, Patricia (July 2009). "Risk and Valor: The Hurt Locker". American Cinematographer. 90 (7): 44–50. Archived from the original on February 17, 2015.
