= David A. Romero =

American poet

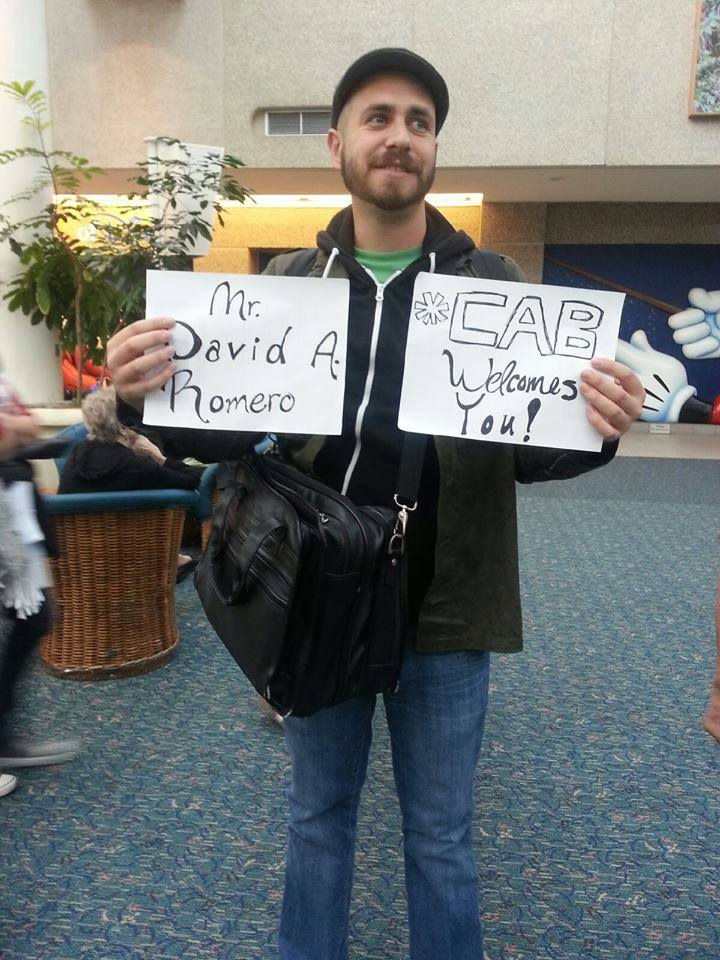
David A. Romero in Orlando International Airport

David A. Romero (born November 20, 1984) is an American spoken word artist, poet, and activist from Diamond Bar, CA. Romero is a graduate of the University of Southern California (USC) and is the second spoken word artist to be featured on All Def Digital, a YouTube channel from Russell Simmons.

== Biography ==
The son of working class Mexican-American parents from the east side of Los Angeles, David A. Romero was born November 20, 1984, in Fontana, California and was raised in Diamond Bar, California.

The youngest of four siblings, Romero attended Diamond Bar High School and graduated from the University of Southern California in 2007 with a double major in Cinema-Television and Philosophy. At USC, Romero's interest in cultural issues and activism developed as the leader of the Student Coalition Against Labor Exploitation (SCALE), a branch of the United Students Against Sweatshops (USAS). After graduating, Romero's interest in activism continued through his time with CALPIRG and is reflected in the content of his spoken word poetry. He is also an active member of the League of Revolutionaries for a New America.

Romero was the host of open mic venue Between the Bars Open Mic in Pomona, California.

He is the cousin of artist Sonia Romero and nephew of artist Frank Romero of Chicano artist collective Los Four.

== Published work ==
Romero has been published in Heartfire: Revolutionary Poets Brigade Anthology (Volume 2), 2013 Kallatumba Press (ISBN 0578127350, 9780578127354), a book including the work of San Francisco poet laureates: Lawrence Ferlinghetti, Jack Hirschman and Alejandro Murguia. Romero has also been published in Revolutionary Poets Brigade: Los Angeles, 2014 Vagabond Press (ISBN 978-0-9885023-0-7) a book including poetry by Michael C. Ford and Luis J. Rodriguez.

Romero has self-published three volumes of poetry, Diamond Bars: The Street Version, Fuzhou, and Ellendale Night, and published his most recent collection, My Name is Romero, through Flower Song Press. Romero has edited and self-published books of poetry for Peer Connections at the LGBT Center and the Well at UC Riverside, National Poetry Month at the Ontario Public Library, the Say What? Teen Poetry program of the Los Angeles Public Library, and students at the Juvenile Detention and Assessment Center in San Bernardino, CA.

== Performance credits ==
Romero has opened for musical acts: Ozomatli, La Santa Cecilia, and Las Cafeteras; poets: Beau Sia, Luis J. Rodriguez, and Francisco X. Alarcon; and activists: Cheri Honkala, Nelson Peery, and Dolores Huerta.

Romero has performed at colleges and universities across the United States such as the University of Central Florida, Champlain College, Whitman College, the University of Southern California, the University of California at San Diego, Chapman University, Cal Pomona Pomona, University of LaVerne, and Loyola Marymount University.
