= Craft Contemporary =

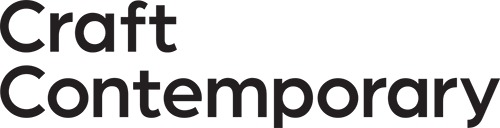
- Established: 1973
- Location: 5814 Wilshire Boulevard; Los Angeles, CA 90036
- Coordinates: 34°03′44″N 118°21′20″W
- Type: Art museum
- Director: Suzanne Isken
- Website: www.craftcontemporary.org

Craft Contemporary, formerly the Craft and Folk Art Museum, is a non-profit, non-collecting arts museum dedicated to showcasing contemporary craft in Los Angeles, California. The museum is located on Los Angeles' Museum Row on Wilshire Boulevard, and across from the George C. Page Museum and La Brea Tar Pits. It is the only institution on the West Coast of the United States to focus exclusively on craft.

In addition to presenting exhibitions, Craft Contemporary is also well-known for its public programs catering to all ages, from family workshops to more intensive sessions for older adults.

== History ==
Formerly known as Craft and Folk Art Museum (CAFAM), the museum was incorporated in 1973 and began formal operations in 1975. It is the successor to the commercial gallery, The Egg and The Eye, which opened November 1, 1965 in the same historic building. Like the present-day museum, the gallery showed contemporary craft objects and folk art. A popular restaurant on the mezzanine featured a long list of ethnically inspired omelettes. When the commercial gallery was converted to a private, nonprofit museum, the restaurant took the name of the former gallery, The Egg and The Eye. The restaurant closed forever, as part of a major renovation, on June 30, 1989. The renovated museum re-opened May 12, 1995, then closed temporarily at the end of 1997, and finally re-opened February 11, 1999.

The building was originally designed by Gilbert Stanley Underwood in 1930 as a mixed-use commercial space. It was renovated twice for The Egg and The Eye by Guy Moore, and then extensively renovated by Hodgetts + Fung in 1995. The original facade remains almost completely intact.

== Edith R. Wyle ==
In 1965, a group of women, led by artist Edith R. Wyle (grandmother of actor Noah Wyle), called the "Folk Art's High Priestess" by the Los Angeles Times, channeled their passion for indigenous art into The Egg and The Eye gallery. The gallery sold fine craft and traditional art from world cultures; the restaurant served over 50 varieties of omelettes.

The success of this concept spurred the formation of the nonprofit Craft and Folk Art Museum (CAFAM) in 1973. When the gallery was converted to a museum, the restaurant took on the gallery's former name: The Egg and The Eye. From the beginning, CAFAM was a "living museum" offering artist-led workshops and educational programs. CAFAM held early shows for now-prominent artists, including Frank Romero, Otto Natzler, Dale Chihuly, and Sam Maloof. Edith Wyle was CAFAM's Artistic Director from 1973 - 1984, when she retired. At that point, she became a member of the Board of Trustees, and took the title of Founder/Director Emeritus.

In 1976, CAFAM initiated Los Angeles' first multicultural festival, the International Festival of Masks. This two-day celebration of folk art, dance, music, and food drew up to 40,000 people through 1994. When Los Angeles hosted the Summer Olympics in July 1984, the Festival of Masks was chosen to be an official event of the Olympic Arts Festival; it was produced over a three-day weekend, July 20–22, 1984.

After 24 years, the restaurant closed forever at the end of June 1989, when the museum had to move temporarily during renovations. The museum was in residence in the historic May Company department store building from November 1989 through the end of 1992. Moving the offices and the library next door (at 5800 Wilshire) to its original building at 5814 Wilshire, CAFAM mounted exhibitions in various off-site venues and hired the architectural firm of Hodgetts + Fung to reconfigure the museum, reopening as a merged structure May 12, 1995. At the end of 1997, CAFAM closed due to financial difficulties; at the time, it was believed to have shut down for good. The permanent collection was sold at auction; the library was given to the L.A. County Museum of Art Research Library; and the institutional archives (staff files, 1965 - 1997) were given to UCLA Young Research Library Special Collections. However, Patrick Ela, who was CAFAM's Administrative Director from 1975 - 1984 and then Executive Director until his resignation in 1996, working with Al Nodal, the General Manager of the L.A. Department of Cultural Affairs, developed a partnership between the CAFAM Board and the City of L.A., which allowed the museum to reopen after 14 months in February 1999.

The Founder of the museum, Edith Wyle, died October 12, 1999, and the following year the City of L.A. honored her with the placement of a commemorative plaque at the corner of Stanley Avenue and Wilshire Boulevard, proclaiming the intersection as "Edith Wyle Square."

== Today ==
In 2018, the museum's board of directors voted to change the name of the institution to Craft Contemporary, publicly announcing the decision in January 2019. According to an interview with Executive Director Suzanne Isken, the new name reflects the changing field of craft from "hav[ing] an association to something very old and very dusty" to a contemporary art form in its own right, rooted in the "now".

The museum's vision of craft is one that is focused on the process and materials, and how these traditions "can be used in unprecedented ways, both in technique and concept."

== Exhibitions ==
According to their mission statement, Craft Contemporary aims to exhibit "established and emerging artists and designers who are often underrepresented in larger art institutions." Because of this emphasis, the museum is known for supporting the early career of important artists—such as Betye Saar, Timothy Washington, Gronk, Beatriz Cortez, and John Riddle, to name a few—before they reach mainstream recognition by larger art institutions.

Notable past exhibitions include:

- "Betye Saar: Keepin' it Clean" (2017)
- Pacific Standard Time: "The US-Mexico Border: Place, Imagination, and Possibility" (2017)
- 1st Clay Biennial, "Melting Point: Movements in Contemporary Clay" (2018)
- "Katherine Gray: As Clear as the Experience" (2018)
- "Sherin Guirguis: Of Thorns and Love" (2018)
- "Merion Estes: Unnatural Disasters" (2018)
- "Beatriz Cortez: Trinidad / Joy Station" (2019)
- "The RIDDLE Effect" (2019)
- "RAW: Craft, Commodity, and Capitalism" (2019)
- "Finding the Center: Works by Echiko Ohira" (2019)
- 2nd Clay Biennial, "The Body, The Object, The Other" (2020)

== In popular culture ==
The museum is destroyed in the 1997 film Volcano when a lava bomb lands in front of the building, setting it ablaze.
