= Wyle Laboratories =

American technical services company

KBRwyle
- Formerly: Wyle Laboratories, Inc. (until 2007); Wyle (2007-2016)
- Type: Private
- Founded: 1949; 77 years ago in El Segundo, California
- Founder: Frank S. Wyle
- Headquarters: El Segundo, California
- Number of locations: 50
- Revenue: US$1.1 billion
- Owner: Court Square Capital Partners (2009-2016); KBR (since 2016)
- Number of employees: Approx. 4,800
- Divisions: Aerospace Group; CAS Group; Integrated Science, Technology, and Engineering Group
- Website: kbr.com/markets/government/kbr-wyle/

Wyle Laboratories (Wyle) is a government services company that provides specialized engineering, scientific, and technical services to the aerospace, defense, nuclear, communications and transportation industries. Clients include NASA, the European Space Agency and the Department of Defense. It was first contracted by NASA on Project Gemini in the 1960s and has been a strategic partner for over 50 years.

In 2016, the company was acquired by KBR, Inc. and rebranded as KBR Wyle. It is still headquartered in El Segundo, California, and has approximately 4,800 employees at more than 50 facilities nationwide. It comprises three primary operating entities: Aerospace Group, CAS Group, and Integrated Science, Technology, and Engineering Group. Annual revenue is approximately $1.1 billion.

== History ==
Founded in 1949 by MIT graduate Frank S. Wyle (1919–2016) with an initial equity investment of $5,000, Wyle Laboratories, Inc. began operations in El Segundo, California as a laboratory for functional and environmental testing of aircraft components. It was the first independent test laboratory for jet aircraft. The company entered the electronic distribution business in the early 1960s. In 1961, Wyle became a public company, with net annual sales totalling $7 million. In 1970, the company broke the $100 million mark in consolidated sales. At the time of Wyle's retirement as chairman in 1984, his equity was worth about $76 million.

In 1995, a group of investors including Stephen Wyle, son of the founder, purchased the scientific services division for $30 million, with Wyle continuing as chairman and CEO. In 1997, Veba AG paid $810 million for the electronics distribution division of the company - Wyle Electronics- while the Scientific Services and Systems Group continued to operate as Wyle Laboratories. In 2003, Littlejohn & Co. acquired a majority stake in Wyle Laboratories for an undisclosed amount.

In 2007, the company changed its name to Wyle; it still operated laboratories, but its primary business focus was on securing long-term services contracts from the Department of Defense, NASA and other Federal agencies. In 1998, Wyle acquired Krug Life Sciences, an aero-medical research company with 30-plus years of history supporting NASA's crewed space flight programs. In 2005, Wyle acquired the General Dynamics Aeronautics division, formerly a part of Veridian, adding aviation research, development, test and evaluation (RDT&E) expertise to the company's portfolio. In 2008, Wyle acquired RS Information Systems, providing services as Wyle Information Systems Group. The acquisition brought total annual revenue to $800 million and the total number of employees to 4,200.

In 2009, Wyle entered into a merger agreement for an undisclosed amount to be acquired by Court Square Capital Partners, an investment company which became the majority shareholder. In 2010, Wyle bought CAS Inc from ITT Corp, valued at $235 million, and organized it as the company's fourth operating group. The CAS Group provides a range of services to the U.S. Army and related customers. In 2013, Wyle opened a $18.75 million facility in Huntsville, Alabama and, in 2014, National Technical Systems, Inc. purchased Wyle's former testing sites in Huntsville, as well as facilities in El Segundo and San Bernardino.

In 2016, KBR purchased Wyle for $570 million becoming KBRwyle.

== Norco controversy ==
The Wyle Labs 450-acre facility in Norco, California was established in 1957 for nuclear research programs, military testing, and working with aerospace firms. In 2002, residents of newly built homes in the area sued the property developers, Centex Homes and Western Pacific Housing, alleging inadequate disclosure of Wyle's operations, which included discreet weapons tests and earthquake simulations. Residents also expressed concerns about potential groundwater contamination to the site and surrounding areas as a result of mishandling and improper disposal of chemicals. A representative for the Riverside County Department of Environmental Health said after an investigation: "Our inspections reveal some violations, but nothing really, really significant. And they [Wyle] have worked with us to make corrections."

The U.S. Environmental Protection Agency later determined that the site was eligible for a spot on the National Superfund list due to pollution but declined to list it, as the state was overseeing site cleanup. In 2003, Wyle signed an order with the California Department of Toxic Substances Control agreeing to find and clean up all contamination from the site. However, state officials said they had no evidence that the contamination posed a significant health threat and an epidemiologist with the California Cancer Registry said he had found no evidence of a cancer cluster.

As of 2021, community groups are monitoring pollution levels.

== Facilities ==
- Norco, California Wyle Laboratories 1841 Hillside Avenue, Norco, California 92860 (Site no longer in operation; Undergoing HAZMAT cleanup)
- Norco, California cryogenic facility
