= Forbidden Ground =

Forbidden Ground may refer to:

- Forbidden Ground (1968 film)
- Forbidden Ground (2013 film)
