= The Librarians: The Next Chapter =

American fantasy-adventure television series

- Genre: Adventure; Fantasy
- Based on: The Librarian by David Titcher
- Developed by: Dean Devlin; John Rogers
- Showrunner: Dean Devlin
- Starring: Callum McGowan; Olivia Morris; Bluey Robinson; Jessica Green
- Composer: Joseph LoDuca
- Country of origin: United States
- Original language: English
- No. of seasons: 2
- No. of episodes: 24

Production
- Executive producers: Dean Devlin; Marc Roskin; Rachel Olschan-Wilson; Noah Wyle
- Production companies: Balkanic Media; CW Studios; Electric Entertainment

Original release
- Network: TNT
- Release: May 25, 2025 – present

Related
- The Librarian (franchise)

The Librarians: The Next Chapter is an American fantasy adventure television series that is a direct spin-off of the Librarian film series, sharing continuity with the films and with The Librarians television series. The series stars Callum McGowan, Jessica Green, Olivia Morris, Bluey Robinson, and Caroline Loncq.

The Librarians: The Next Chapter premiered on TNT on May 25, 2025 with its first season of twelve episodes. The second season premiered on August 2, 2026.

== Cast ==
=== Main ===
- Callum McGowan as Vikram Chamberlain, the active Librarian of 1847 who is released from a timeless imprisonment in 2025 and takes up work as the head Librarian of the Belgrade Annex. He is renowned as one of the greatest swordfighters in the world and carries a sword sheathed in a cane, while his first name is non-Anglophone due to his being born in India.
- Olivia Morris as:
  - Dr. Lysa Pascal, a mathematician, engineer, and physicist who inherits a castle in Belgrade which hosts an Annex to the Library. She is initially skeptical of the existence of magic but comes to accept it as real while still perceiving it as an untapped branch of science.
  - Anya, General Bogdan Gregor's fiancée and Vikram's lover, who is also Lysa's direct ancestor
- Bluey Robinson as Connor Green, an expert historian and disgraced university professor-turned-Internet video-streaming conspiracy theorist with a large following, who discovers the Library out of his determination to prove that it exists
- Jessica Green as Charlie Cornwall, a U.S. military veteran and Guardian candidate who is given a second chance by Jacob Stone and charged with protecting Vikram, Lysa, and Connor

=== Recurring ===
- Caroline Loncq as Mrs. Elaine Astolat/Elaine of Astolat - the Belgrade Annex's immortal caretaker, who has taken up a variety of interests and hobbies as a result of her immortality. In "And Going Medieval", she is revealed to be a former knight of Camelot, whose role as a knight was erased from history by a vengeful Lancelot.
  - Gledisa Arthur portrays young Elaine, an aspiring knight (season 2)
- Adnan Hasković as General Bogdan Gregor (season 1) - the leader of the sinister cult Gregor's Hammer and Vikram's archenemy
- Aleksa Samardzic as Winslow Lynch (season 1) - lead member of the heavy metal band Gregor's Hammer, named after the cult, who colludes to free Gregor from a time trap
- Harun Cehovic as Huey, Nedjeljko Popac as Louie, and Ilija Devic as Dewey (season 1) - remaining members of Gregor's Hammer who follow Winslow Lynch
- Dominic Monaghan as Merlin (season 2), the legendary wizard friend of King Arthur and the Knights of the Round Table and formerly the most powerful magic-user in the world, whose corrupting obsession with magic led to the fall of Camelot. He was imprisoned in a tree for centuries, leading to the loss of his magical abilities, and is driven by the belief that magic, if handled properly, can be used for good despite the harmful effects it has on those around him, and even the addiction it creates within himself. Once he realizes the error of his ways, he is invited to serve as an archivist in the main Library.

=== Guest ===
- Christian Kane as Jacob Stone, one of the Librarians from the Portland, Oregon Annex who specializes in archaeology, art history, and architecture. He was introduced in The Librarians.
- Arielle Dombasle as Dame Anna Mirinoff (season 1)
- Celyn Jones as Cupid, God of Love; Vikram's friend (season 1)
- Ike Bennett as Pedro Worth, a friend of Connor's (season 1)
- Philip Rosch as Sir Lancelot du Lac (season 1), Elaine's former lover and fellow ex-knight of Camelot, who became immortal along with her when they summoned the power of his shield during a battle in Medieval times. Matt Frewer played Lancelot living as a 21st-century man and using the name "Dulaque" in The Librarians, serving as the main antagonist of the first season, with Jerry O'Connell playing his younger self.
- Hannah Devlin as Hermione Palvis, a descendant of the ancient Greek Muses who can make art come alive (season 1)
- Eva Megyar as Katherine, (season 1), Hermione's grandmother
- Monica Lacy as Janis Copeland (season 1), an agent of the Department of Statistical Anomalies (DOSA)
- Josh Gates as an archaeologist and former colleague of Connor's (season 2)
- Jeremy Swift as a flamboyant genie (season 2), who can grant wishes to anyone who explicitly states "I wish" if he is released and unbound from his bottle
- Flula Borg and Britta Boehlke, respectively, as Gunther and Hilda (season 2), two hosts of a popular cooking show who are secretly a magically-charged, cannibalistic Hansel and Gretel
- Oliver Dench as Robert/"The Red Rock", a kindly scientist and Lysa's love interest who secretly uses a strength-boosting artifact to fight crime as a superhero, unaware it turns those around him into criminals to fight
- Claudia Summers as Jill Pascal (season 2), Lysa's late mother
- Evan Milton as Luc Pascal (season 2), Lysa's late father
- Holly Donovan as Amy Scott (season 2)
- Lindy Booth (season 2) as Cassandra Cillian, one of the Librarians from the Portland Annex who specializes in mathematics and practices magic. She was introduced in The Librarians and officially joined the Library at the same time as Jacob Stone.
- Ty Tennant as Peter Pan (season 2), the current incarnation of the Greek god Pan, who is determined to recapture the characters of his story world so he can return to Neverland
- Reece Ritchie as Benedict Hale (season 2), Virkam's immediate successor and the active Librarian of 1847-1857, who accidentally imprisoned himself in an artifact courtesy of Anya after conspiring to use magic for his own gain
- Jack Cunningham-Nuttall as King Arthur (season 2), as he was before he became the ruler of Camelot

== Episodes ==
Season	Episodes	Originally released	
Season	Episodes	First released	Last released
1	12	May 25, 2025	August 4, 2025
2	12	August 2, 2026	September 7, 2026

=== Season 1 (2025) ===
No. overall	No. in season	Title	Directed by	Written by	Original release date	U.S. viewers (millions)
1	1	"And the Deadly Drekavac"	Dean Devlin	Dean Devlin & John Rogers	May 25, 2025	0.81
In 1847 Belgrade, the eccentric British gentleman Vikram Chamberlain prevents General Bogdan Gregor from obtaining the Sword of Mars, revealing himself as the Librarian, sworn to safeguard magical artifacts. But using the Scarab of Horus traps Vikram in time, until rescued by modern-day Librarian Jacob Stone. Vikram, obsessed with returning to his lost love Anya, un-caps the Well of Magic, unleashing a flood into present-day Serbian ley lines. Coincidentally arriving are science prodigy Lysa Pascal, reluctant heir to Belgrade Castle, which secretly houses a Library Annex; and historian Connor Green, who hosts the conspiracy-hunting Spectral Snoops podcast. Through accidental contact, the Stone of Kraljevic summons a dangerous Drekavac spirit, forcing a fight to contain it. Jacob assigns previous Guarduan candidate Charlie Cornwall as Vikram's Guardian. Via scrying glass, Vikram tracks the Drekavac to local heavy metal band Gregor's Hammer. Subdued with its own tears, the Drekavac is granted peace, saving its host, Danica Lynch. Magical surges threaten Library stability; Jacob warns that chaos will spread worldwide. Vikram stays in the present to fix his mistake; Connor and Lysa join him as the "next chapter" of Librarians. Anya is revealed as the fiancée of Gregor, who appears ominously after Winslow Lynch picks up Vikram's scrying glass, suggesting more threats to follow.
2	2	"And the Dance of Doom"	Sandra Mitrović	Kate Rorick	May 26, 2025	N/A
Mysteriously, a ballerina dances into on-coming traffic, sending her into a coma, with her feet still dancing. At the Annex, new librarians Lysa and Connor meet caretaker Elaine Astolat, who reveals the extent of magic now loose in the world after Vikram tampered with the magical well. Investigating the strange ballet incident, the team discovers the ballerina was cursed and that a dark force is affecting the entire ballet company. Suspicion falls on Dame Anna, the theatre director, as bizarre incidents escalate—like dancers' shoes catching fire mid-rehearsal. Clues lead the team to a magical "dance tree," and its resin, used to control dancers and drain their vitality. The culprit is revealed to be Lady Midday, a youth-stealing witch—who is, in fact, Dame Anna. She plans to hijack the ballet's performance of Giselle to steal the essence of the audience and regain her youth. During the final performance, Anna nearly succeeds, but Vikram secretly sabotages the music's tempo, breaking her spell. She crumbles to dust, the threat ends, and the audience applauds, unaware of the real danger. Back at the Annex, the team reflects on their success. Despite continued bickering, Connor and Lysa are learning to work together.
3	3	"And the Ghost Train"	Milan Todorović	Tom MacRae	June 2, 2025	0.32
Vikram reviews recent history; Connor and Lysa surprise him with a computer. Charlie stays to bond with Lysa, while Connor and Vikram use the Magic Door. A frozen time sprite transports them onto a spectral locomotive stuck in a 1970s time loop. Gradually, by viewing various moments, they discover Caucaslyvia's king Kavod was killed by British agent Ava Ryba, alias Bella Goodridge, who was trading the Scythe of Time (which allows communication with one's past self) to free her lover Nikolai, Kavod's body double; but Kavod had first mortally shot Nikolai. Charlie and Lysa bring the elderly Bella onboard where she reverts to her younger self. Bella retrieves the scythe, but Kavod takes possession, wielding it to control Bella, Vikram and Connor. Vikram briefly touches it, sending a message to his past self to retrieve the mystical Nectar of Niobe to free the time sprite, who then defeats Kavod, breaking the loop. Bella finds peace with a dying Nikolai before the train stops, and she reverts to old age. Connor encourages Vikram to open up about his dislocation in time and the pain of being separated from Anya. Vikram secretly keeps the Scythe of Time, foreshadowing future consequences.
4	4	"And the Thief of Love"	Nemanja Ćipranić	Rebecca Rosenberg	June 9, 2025	N/A
A woman with a bow robs a Paris bank, shooting magic arrows that turn customers and employees into infatuated lovers. Vikram, intrigued by the artifact's emotional power, hopes it might reconnect him to Anya. The team seeks out the mythological Cupid who enchanted the arrows. Now a jaded, retired deity, disillusioned by modern dating apps, Cupid reveals he buried his arrows, but doesn't recall where. Using magic detection, the librarians trace the magic to an underground cache linked to Marie, who was wronged by her wealthy ex-employer, Guy LeRoy. Marie has been using the arrows to exact revenge on Guy, who fired her after she refused his advances. With Vikram struck by one of the arrows, he falls under Marie's influence and joins her scheme to unleash mass infatuation at the Paris Museum, masking an artifact heist. To free Vikram, Charlie brings him to Anya's grave, breaking the spell. Cupid returns to intervene, reclaims his arrows, and stops the theft. Marie, however, isn't all wrong—she reveals Guy's corruption via documents from the bank. Cupid offers poetic justice by hitting Guy with a love arrow just as investigators arrive, leading him to blurt out his crimes in front of authorities.
5	5	"And the Memory Crystal"	Milan Konjević	Gary Rosen	June 16, 2025	N/A
6	6	"And the House of Cards"	Orsi Nagypál	Sean Persaud & Sinéad Persaud	June 23, 2025	0.34
7	7	"And the Con-Con"	Sandra Mitrović	Tom MacRae	June 30, 2025	0.35
8	8	"And the Hangover from Hell"	Hannah Espia-Farbova	Rebecca Rosenberg	July 7, 2025	0.38
The Librarians struggle to remember how they were thrown off a stairway balcony after a bachelorette party for Lysa's high school friend, Suki. Each contributes what they can remember: Charlie's "jazzy" noir conspiracy, Connor's Bond-esque intrigue, and Lysa's rational viewpoint. Charlie suspects Suki is scheming to buy Lysa's castle, and tries to catch her lying. Connor believes Suki is using her engagement ring to ensorcell Lysa. Charlie, Connor, and Lysa all remember Vikram drinking too much, and each claims to have knocked over the ice sculpture. Lysa recalls booking Winslow Lynch's band Greggor's Hammer (after saving his sister Danica from "...the Deadly Drekavac"). She explains Suki's behavior, but smells Valerian root on Vikram's cocktail umbrella (and Suki uses Valeriana Sleep Support). Vikram remembers wedding planner Viola drugging his drink and deduces she's an escaped ice vila, fomenting human hatred to consume souls. They confront Viola to save Suki and each other. Winslow retrieves the scrying glass he used to gather intelligence for Gregor, who instructs him, "Bring me from this time prison into your world," now that he knows who Vikram loves, the Library's location, and "how to hurt him the way he hurt me!"
9	9	"And the Feast of the Vampir"	Milan Todorović	Kate Rorick	July 14, 2025	0.34
The Librarians visit a vampire festival in a village said to be home to the first documented vampire in history. Connor pursues a mysterious figure and is frightened by its vaporous movements, causing him fall off a hillside he was climbing towards a castle wall. He wakes up beside a friendly vampire named Petar, who is missing a fang and saved him from serious injury by biting him, leaving one puncture in his neck. Petar claims he needs his other fang in order to prevent Connor from being fully vampirized by nightfall and advises him to stay out of direct sunlight. Their search causes Connor to realize that Flynn Carsen, the main Librarian of the present day, has already taken the fang back to the Library; he escapes through the magic door, leaving Vikram and Charlie at the hands of fanatical vampire hunters who falsely believe Vikram to be a vampire. While they attempt an escape, Connor finds the fang but is challenged by a riddling animated suit of armor. After Connor easily answers two riddles, Lysa, who has been trying to keep the Library secret from an investor, helps him correctly answer a chemistry question, and they hurry back to the festival, where they find Vikram, Charlie, and Petar locked in pillories by the vampire hunters. Connor reunites Petar with his fang, and when the hunters pursue him into daylight, he remains unharmed. Petar reveals himself as Petar Blagojević, the first recorded vampire, and threatens to devour the lead hunter, a descendant of Abraham Van Helsing. Connor risks his life by suggesting Petar eat him instead, but as he attempts to bite Connor, a cyanide failsafe on the fang activates, reducing him to ashes.
10	10	"And Going Medieval"	Suri Krishnamma	Dean Devlin & Gary Rosen	July 21, 2025	0.33
Vikram goes to speak to Astolat privately. Curious, the team follows him to a discrete location where he activates a time machine he has constructed, intending to go back to 1847. As the team struggles to wrestle the device from him, the date malfunctions and sends the quartet back to the year 847 A.D., where they are taken prisoners in a Medieval village on suspicion of sorcery. Elsewhere, Lancelot du Lac, a former knight of Camelot exiled due to his corrupting obsession with magic, hears about their arrival from a squire and leads a group of fellow rogue English knights to search for his shield, taking the time machine with them. The Librarians discover that Astolat lives in the village but is unaware of their or the Library's existence; she reveals to Charlie that she is Lancelot's former lover and fellow knight of Camelot, whose role as a knight has been erased from history by him, and that she has been hiding his shield. Vikram allows himself to be captured and tortured by Lancelot's group so Lysa and Connor can steal the time machine back, but they are all caught trying to escape and taken to be burned at the stake alongside the village governor. Astolat trades the shield for the Librarians, and Lancelot uses its power to become immortal. Astolat challenges him to a duel and, with Charlie's help, gets a hold of the shield, becoming immortal herself. Lancelot leaves in shame after his group retreats, but he swears vengeance. Vikram, who had wanted to go back in time so he could visit his baby, who was born after he was sent to the future, takes the team home, deeming them, especially Lysa, his newfound family.
11	11	"And the Graffiti of the Gods"	Milena Grujić	Tom MacRae	July 28, 2025	0.32
In Belgrade's arts district, a shop owner chases 17-year-old Hermione, accusing theft. A graffiti "hoodie" person "disappears" him. Winslow Lynch reports informs Gregor of his finding Hermione, heralding Gregor's return. Hermione tells her "Gran" Katherine what happened, as Gregor's acolytes attack. Storm and knight paintings protect her. To the librarians, Hermione admits painting the hoodies. After finding the shop owner as new graffiti, they test for magical sources. Winslow's chanting enthralls Lysa and Connor to bring him Hermione; paintings of Katherine and a sad clown capture Lysa and Connor into canvases. With the maternal Greek surname Pavilis, Vikram realizes Hermione is descended from the Muses, who give art life. Huey and acolytes go after Hermione. Winslow tries but fails to enthrall Charlie and Vikram. Hermione's paintings fight back. Acolytes flee, but Winslow plants Gregor's painting in Hermione's studio. In a vision, Hermione's mother encourages Hermione, who frees Lysa and Connor from her paintings, which also frees Gregor. Lynch captures Hermione, handing Gregor the Dagger of Urania for her sacrifice. Charlie gets Hermione a spray paint can to create cartoon-like weapons and obstacles. They defeat Gregor and his men, but Winslow threatens Connor, forcing Vikram to free Gregor so he can save Connor's life.
12	12	"And the Unfinished Business"	Marc Roskin	Dean Devlin & Gary Rosen	August 4, 2025	0.37
Vikram discovers Gregor used his new Sorcerer's Brigade to open the tomb of Attila the Hun. With six months ended, Lysa, Connor and Charlie prepare to leave the Annex, which will be folded back into the Library, ceasing to exist. Jacob Stone returns, but Vikram announces "unfinished business." The Pendulum explodes, marking Caucaslyvia's capitol building. President Raddos abdicates to Gregor, who wields the Sword of Mars. DOSA (Department of Static Anomalies) summons Stone to the United Nations; Janis Copeland reports worldwide defense system failures, including nuclear missiles. Gregor targets cities worldwide, demanding "total surrender." Connor and Mrs. Astolat learn the sword wielder can be defeated by someone loved. Vikram points to Lysa upon seeing Anya's portrait. Lysa, as Anya, cons the sword from Gregor, but he summons it back. Vikram challenges Gregor to a duel, which he is about to lose as Stone arrives with Excalibur. Defeated, Gregor's soul is absorbed by the Sword of Mars, which is taken to the Library. The Library changes their plane tickets into invitations for the Metropolitan Public Library. Vikram uses the scrying glass on Anya's portrait to say goodbye forever. Merlin declares, "This is not the end of the story."

=== Season 2 (2026) ===
No. overall	No. in season	Title	Directed by	Written by	Original release date	U.S. viewers (millions)
13	1	"And the Burning Heart"	Dean Devlin	Rebecca Rosenberg & John Rogers	August 2, 2026	N/A
14	2	"And the Tethered Wish"	Marc Roskin	Kate Rorick	August 3, 2026	N/A
15	3	"And the Vanishing Bankers"	Milan Todorović	Tom MacRae	August 9, 2026	N/A
16	4	"And the Recipe for Disaster"	Sandra Mitrović	Sean Persaud & Sinead Persaud	August 10, 2026	N/A
17	5	"And the Red Rock"	Marc Roskin	Gary Rosen	August 16, 2026	N/A
18	6	"And Descartes' Nightmare"	Milan Konjević	John Rogers & Rebecca Rosenberg	August 17, 2026	N/A
19	7	"And the Monkey's Paw"	Milena Grujić	Tom MacRae	August 23, 2026	N/A
20	8	"And the Last Resort"	Milan Konjević	Sean Persaud & Sinead Persaud	August 24, 2026	N/A
21	9	"And the Toy Phone"	Milan Todorović	Rebecca Rosenberg	August 30, 2026	N/A
22	10	"And the Heart of a Librarian"	Sandra Mitrović	Kate Rorick	August 31, 2026	N/A
23	11	"And What Dreams May Come"	Marc Roskin	John Rogers	September 6, 2026	TBD
24	12	"And the Camelot Conundrum"	Dean Devlin	Dean Devlin & Gary Rosen	September 7, 2026	TBD

== Production ==
Season 1 poster

=== Development ===
In May 2023, it was announced that a spinoff of The Librarians was in the works at The CW. In August 2024, it was announced that the series was picked up for a two-season order at TNT, with its first season to consist of twelve episodes. Dean Devlin is set as the showrunner of the series and is executive producing alongside Marc Roskin, Rachel Olschan-Wilson, and Noah Wyle, who portrayed Flynn Carsen, the protagonist of the original Librarian films.

=== Casting ===
In February 2024, it was announced that Jessica Green had joined the cast of The Librarians: The Next Chapter. In March, it was announced Christian Kane would reprise the role of Jacob Stone, and that British actors Callum McGowan, Olivia Morris, Bluey Robinson, and Caroline Loncq had also joined the cast of the series.

=== Filming ===
By May 2025, the second season of The Librarians: The Next Chapter had begun filming. The series is filmed on-location in Belgrade, Serbia, with the Military Museum entrance of the Belgrade Fortress serving as the exterior of "Belgrade Castle" where the fictional library is housed, and interiors shot in a Serbian studio.

== Release ==
The Librarians: The Next Chapter premiered on TNT on May 25, 2025. The series was originally set to premiere on The CW in October 2024, before being pulled from the schedule. The second season premiered on August 2, 2026.
