= Jessica Green (actress) =

Australian actress (born 1993)

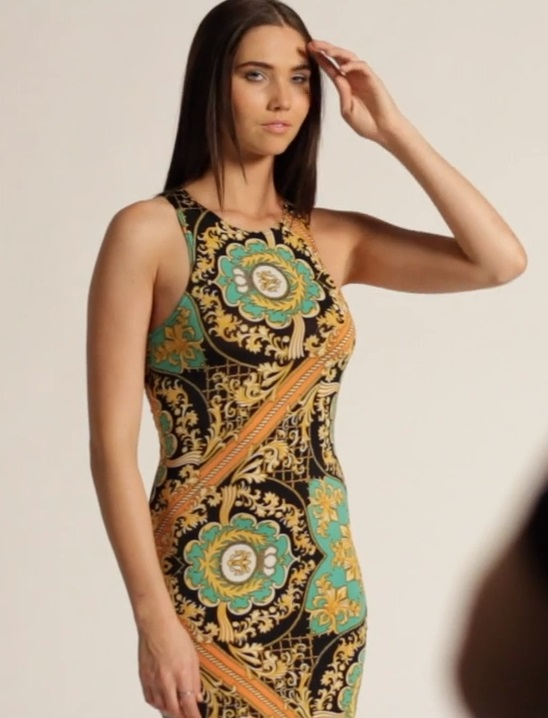
- Green at a photoshoot in 2012
- Born: 11 February 1993 (age 33); Tasmania, Australia
- Occupation: Actress
- Years active: 2012–present

Jessica Green (born 11 February 1993) is an Australian actress. On television, she is known for her roles in the Network 10 teen drama Lightning Point (2012), the CW series The Outpost (2018–2021), and the TNT series The Librarians: The Next Chapter (2025–). Her films include Red Billabong (2016).

== Life and career ==
Jessica Greene was born on the island of Tasmania, Australia. At the age of 19 her martial arts skills landed her the role of Kiki for 26 episodes of the fantasy teen drama series Lightning Point. Having minimal prior training in acting, Green worked for six months with an acting coach during filming of the series. In 2014, Green appeared as Amber in the Australian crime drama film Rise, and as Rebecca in the 2016 supernatural horror film Red Billabong. In 2018, Green was cast as Cleopatra in season 2 of Roman Empire - Julius Caesar: Master of Rome.

Between 2018 and 2020, Green played the character of Talon, the last survivor of her race, the Blackbloods, in 49 episodes of The CW's fantasy-adventure drama television series The Outpost. Green reportedly performed her own stunts and fight scenes during filming, with only minor injuries. Green employs a strict fitness regimen with well-disciplined daily training and maintains a healthy diet and lifestyle.

She attended the 45th Saturn Awards at the Avalon Hollywood, Los Angeles in 2019, to represent The Outpost, which was nominated for Best Fantasy Television Series 2019 but lost to Game of Thrones.

Green resumed filming of the third season of The Outpost in Serbia in late 2020, alongside fellow actors Jake Stormoen and Anand Desai-Barochia. The CW announced that the third season would be extended by a further 13 episodes in 2020. The fourth and final season premiered on July 15, 2021.

In 2022, Green joined the cast of the film Air, involving Ben Affleck, Matt Damon, Jason Bateman, and Gustaf Skarsgård.

== Personal life ==
On 16 December 2024, Green got engaged.

== Filmography ==
=== Film ===
Year	Title	Role
2014	Rise	Amber
2016	Red Billabong	Rebecca
2017	Pirates of the Caribbean: Dead Men Tell No Tales	Townswoman
2019	Cino	Isabelle
2022	Sparkle: A Unicorn Tale	Natalie
2023	Air	Katrina Sainz

=== Television ===
Year	Title	Role	Notes
2012	Lightning Point	Kiki	26 episodes
2017	Dirty, Clean, & Inbetween	Laura	TV film
2018	Ash vs Evil Dead	Lexx	1 episode - The Mettle of Man
2018	Stage Mums	Casting Assistant	1 episode - The Waiting Room
2018	Roman Empire	Cleopatra	Series 2 – "Julius Caesar: Master of Rome" - 2 episodes
2018–2021	The Outpost	Talon	Main role - 49 episodes
2023	FBI: International	CiCi Pryor	1 episode - BHITW
2025–present	The Librarians: The Next Chapter	Charlie Cornwall	
