= Ray Tico =

Costa Rican singer and musician

- Born: Ramon Jacinto Herrera; 1928; Limón, Costa Rica
- Died: August 15, 2007 (aged 78–79)
- Occupation: Musician

Ramón Jacinto Herrera (1928–2007), known as Ray Tico, was a musician from Costa Rica. Considered an icon of popular Costa Rican music, he has been the only foreigner to be part of the Cuban Filin movement. A singer and guitarist, he wrote popular songs such as "Romance en La Habana", "Eso es imposible", "México de luz y color", el bolero "Dominicana", "Me quedo callado", "Dialoguemos", "Solo para recordar".

== Biography ==
Ramon Jacinto Herrera, alias Ray Tico, was born in Limón, Costa Rica in 1928. He received his first guitar when he was 7 years old. When he was a teenager, he left for Colombia as a fisherman, and there began his career as a musician.

== Musical career ==
In 1953, he went to Cuba where he adopted the nickname Ray Tico, as well as composing "Eso es Imposible" ("That is Impossible"), his biggest hit among the more than 50 other songs that he wrote. His unique style of guitar playing, which notably included using it as a percussion instrument, became his personal stamp of distinction. With his new fame, Ray moved to the U.S., frequently playing at the Waldorf Astoria New York. Later in Hollywood, he gained fame as a playboy, often invited to join the most famous people of the era like Frank Sinatra, Nat King Cole, and Sammy Davis Jr. In 1969, at the age of 41, after having passed on the music and culture of Costa Rica throughout the world, Ray returned to Costa Rica to stay. He spent the next 38 years writing songs and playing in virtually every important event that occurred in the country, including presidential inaugurations.

== Personal life ==
Ray Tico married Juanita Pagán on 1957 in Puerto Rico. From that marriage they had two children: Ramón Ricaurte Herrera Pagán and Agosto Herrera Pagán, both from Puerto Rico.

== Death ==
Ray Tico died in 2007 at the age of 79. Only weeks before his death, Papaya Music celebrated 8 decades of his career, and despite his failing health, he performed with Editus and other notable Costa Rican musicians.
