= Dan Ewing =

Australian actor (born 1985)

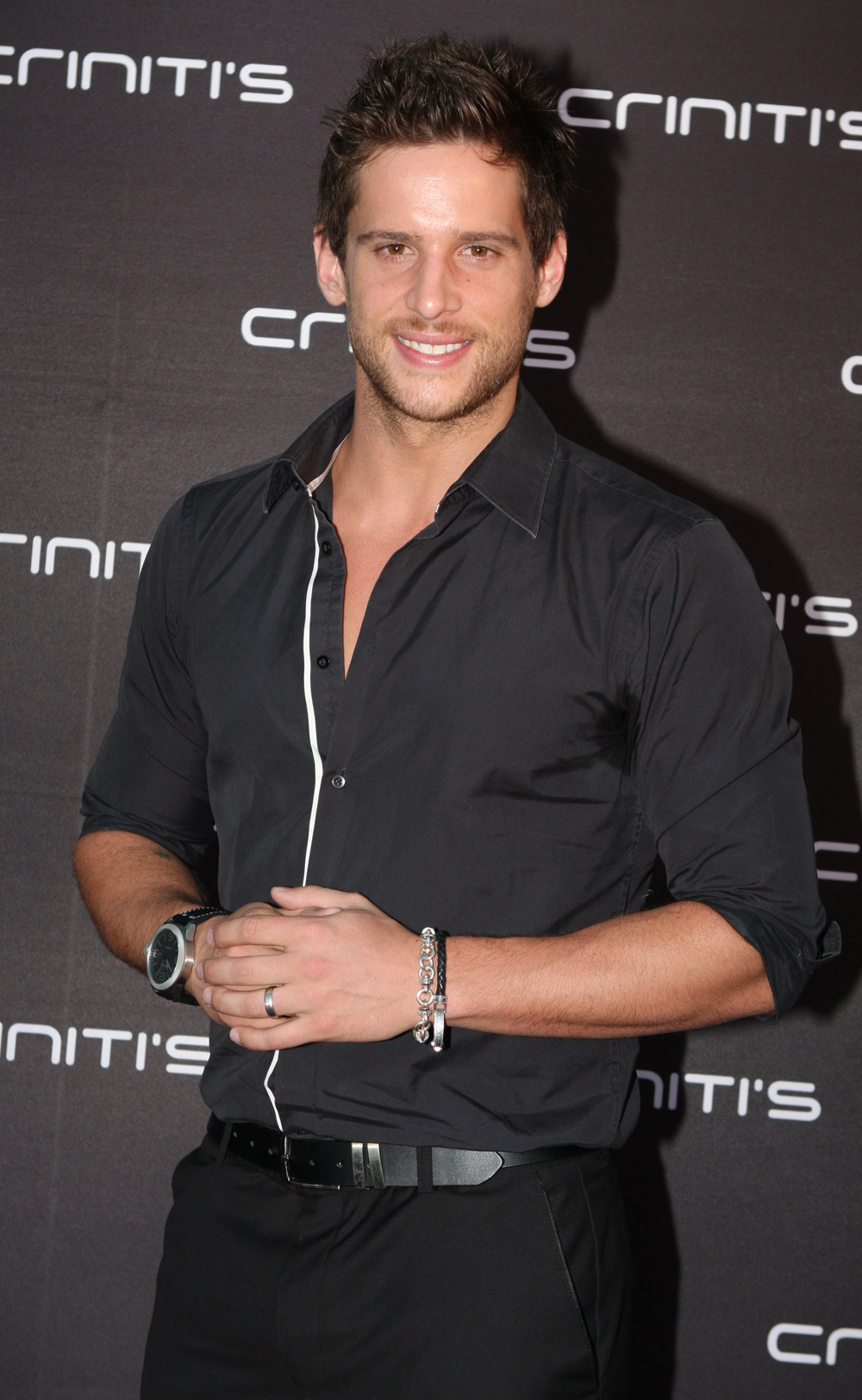
- Ewing in March 2013
- Born: Daniel Alan Ewing; 3 June 1985 (age 41); Manly, New South Wales, Australia
- Occupation: Actor
- Years active: 2003–present
- Spouse: Marni Little (m. 2012; div. 2016)
- Children: 2

Daniel Alan Ewing (born 3 June 1985), is an Australian actor. He appeared on Seven Network's Home and Away series as Reuben Humphries in 2007. In 2011 he returned to the show and rose to prominence for his portrayal of Heath Braxton.

== Early life ==
Ewing was born in Manly and grew up in Forestville. He is the eldest of four children. Ewing attended Marist Catholic College North Shore, where he took part in various musicals. Ewing played representative basketball for Manly Warringah and he took part in two state championships and toured the U.S. and Canada. Ewing was a part-time student at NIDA, attending the Open Program courses.

== Career ==
Ewing appeared in Home and Away as Reuben Humpheries in 2007. He has also had guest roles in Blue Water High, Spirited and Rescue: Special Ops. Ewing secured a role as Dillon the Black RPM Ranger in children's television series Power Rangers RPM.

In September 2010, Ewing joined the cast of Home and Away again, this time as Heath Braxton. The actor made his debut in February 2011. Ewing also became a contestant on the 11th season of Dancing with the Stars. He was partnered with Luda Kroiter, and danced in support of the St Vincent de Paul Society, where his mother works. Ewing and Kroiter were eliminated in week five. On 9 December 2013, Ewing confirmed that he would be leaving Home and Away, and made his on-screen departure during the following year.

Ewing reprised his role as Heath Braxton for the feature-length special, Home and Away: An Eye for an Eye, along with co-star Lisa Gormley (Bianca Scott). In 2016, Ewing returned to Home and Away, along with Gormley. Both Ewing and Gormley starred in the feature-length specials Home and Away: Revenge and Home and Away: All or Nothing. Ewing also starred in the Australian feature film Red Billabong, alongside Tim Pocock. He has roles in Dunamis, and Chasing Comets.

In 2018, Ewing starred in horror film Beast No More, and the sci-fi action film Occupation, alongside Temuera Morrison. He filmed an appearance in the sci-fi thriller 1, directed by Robert Braiden, and made a guest appearance in the ninth episode of Harrow. In April 2019, Ewing joined the cast of Love and Monsters. He reprised his Occupation role of Matt Simmons in the 2021 sequel Occupation: Rainfall. He also reprised his role of Heath Braxton in Home and Away for a guest stint. Ewing later stated that while he would not rule out a further return to the soap, he wanted to concentrate on his film work. In 2023, Ewing starred in the Australian horror film Godless: The Eastfield Exorcism.

== Personal life ==
Ewing became engaged to Marni Little in September 2011, and they married on 15 December 2012. Little gave birth to their son in September 2014. The couple announced their separation in 2016.

Ewing has been in a relationship with actress Kat Risteska since August 2016. He announced their engagement on 24 December 2021. In March 2022, they confirmed they were expecting their first child together, and Risteska gave birth to their daughter on 22 July 2022.

In December 2011 Ewing was arrested after a domestic disturbance where police were called to the apartment he shared with Marni Little. The police filed a DVO to protect Little but charges were dropped after Little took the stand to support Ewing.

On 21 October 2018, Ewing allegedly assaulted Little's husband David Robertshaw during a custody swap of their son. Ewing and Robertshaw argued for almost an hour while keeping his son locked in the car, before the police were called to the scene. Ewing was given an apprehended violence order (AVO) and faced Manly Local Court on 6 November 2018. On 3 November 2018, Ewing was handed another AVO, this time to keep away from Little's home and was due to attend Manly Local Court on 13 November 2018.

== Filmography ==
=== Television ===
Year	Title	Role	Notes
2007	Home and Away	Reuben Humpheries	Recurring role; Season 20
2008	Blue Water High		Guest role
2009	Rescue: Special Ops	Jack Gardener	Episode #1.09
2009	Power Rangers RPM	Dillon / Ranger Operator Series Black	Series regular
2010	Spirited	Jason Stone	Episode #1.05
2011–2014, 2016–2017, 2021	Home and Away	Heath Braxton	Series regular
2015	Home and Away: An Eye for an Eye	Heath Braxton	Feature-length special
2016	Home and Away: Revenge	Heath Braxton	Feature-length special
2017	Home and Away: All or Nothing	Heath Braxton	Feature-length special
2018	Harrow	Nurse Rawlings	Episode: "Lex Talionis" ("The Law of Retaliation")

=== Film ===
Year	Title	Role	Notes
2004	Dead Meat	Castle Zombie	
2006	Superman Returns	University Student	
2007	Grand Smoke	Vincent	
2008	Revolution	Brandon	
2016	Factory Hands	Lewis Hine	Short film
2016	Red Billabong	Nick Marshall	
2018	Beast No More	Jake	
2018	1	Darren	
2018	Occupation	Matt Simmons	
2018	Chasing Comets	Chase	
2020	Love and Monsters	Cap	
2021	Occupation: Rainfall	Matt Simmons	
2023	The Silent Service	Nelson Asimov 3rd Fleet Chief of Staff USS Abraham Lincoln	
2023	Godless: The Eastfield Exorcism	Ron Levonde	
2025	Zombie Plane		

=== Theatre ===
Year	Title	Role	Director	Theatre
1999	Jesus Christ Superstar	Chorus	Anthony McDonald	McDonald Theatre Company – Sydney (Musical)
2002	Godspell	Singer	Anthony McDonald	McDonald Theatre Company (Musical)
2003	Les Misérables	Brujon	Anthony McDonald	McDonald Theatre Company (Musical)
