= Olivia Morris =

English actress (born 1997)

- Born: 29 January 1997 (age 29); Kingston upon Thames, London, England
- Education: Royal Welsh College of Music & Drama
- Occupation: Actress
- Years active: 2017–present

Olivia Kathleen F. Morris (born 29 January 1997) is an English actress. She appeared in the Indian film RRR (2022). On television, she is known for her roles in the BritBox series Hotel Portofino (2022–), the HBO series The Head (2022–2025), and the TNT series The Librarians: The Next Chapter (2025– ).

== Early life ==
Olivia Morris was born on 29 January 1997. She is from Kingston upon Thames, Greater London. Morris attended Hurtwood House. She joined the National Youth Theatre and went on to train at the Royal Welsh College of Music & Drama, graduating in 2018.

== Career ==
Morris appeared in the music video for the song "London's Blues" by Ferris & Sylvester. She voiced Green in the Big Finish Productions Doctor Who audio drama Vanguard featuring the Seventh Doctor. She appeared in the Paines Plough production of Albatross at the Gate Theatre in Camden.

In 2022, Morris made her television debut as Alice Mays-Smith in the 2022 period drama Hotel Portofino, which premiered on BritBox, and feature film debut as Jennifer in the Telugu film RRR directed by S. S. Rajamouli. Later in 2022, Morris joined the main cast of the HBO Asia thriller The Head for its second season as Rachel Russo.

== Filmography ==
=== Films ===
Year	Title	Role	Notes
2020	The Turtles	Emma	Short film
2022	RRR	Jennifer "Jenny"	Indian-Telugu Film

=== Television ===
Year	Title	Role	Notes
2022–present	Hotel Portofino	Alice Mays-Smith	Main role
2022	Professor T	Valerie Peters	Episode: "Ring of Fire"
2022–2025	The Head	Rachel Russo	Main role (seasons 2–3)
2023	Hapless	Policewoman	Episode: "The Donor"
2025–present	The Librarians: The Next Chapter	Lysa Pascal	

Music videos
Year	Song	Artist	Notes
2017	"London's Blues"	Ferris & Sylvester	
