= Elegy for a Revolutionary =

- Film poster
- Directed by: Paul van Zyl
- Written by: Paul van Zyl
- Starring: Brian Ames, Martin Copping, Michael Enright
- Release date: 5 April 2013
- Running time: 22 min

Elegy for a Revolutionary is a 2013 short film directed and written by Paul van Zyl. The film stars Brian Ames, Martin Copping, and Michael Enright, and is based on the true story of a group of young white South Africans trying to protest apartheid.

Copping's role as Jeremy James won the Best Actor award at the 2013 Filmstock Film Festival.

== Cast ==
- Brian Ames as Donald Quick
- Martin Copping as Jeremy James
- Michael Enright as Sersant
- Steve Humphreys as Hendricks
- Glen Vaughan as Hunter
- David Ross Paterson as Judge
- Marcia Battise as Miriam
- Tomas Boykin as Ori
- Anthony Holiday as Maduba
- Keston John as Henry

== Reception ==
Film Threat gave a positive review for the film, saying that their "only complaint about Elegy for a Revolutionary is that it’s a short and not a feature".
