= Pieter Schlosser =

Guatemalan-American film and TV composer (born 1980)

- Born: August 17, 1980 (age 46); Guatemala City, Guatemala
- Other name: Pieter A. Schlosser
- Education: Berklee College of Music
- Occupation: Composer
- Years active: 2003 - present
- Musical career
- Genres: Film scores, orchestral, video games
- Website: www.pieterschlosser.com

Pieter Schlosser (born August 17, 1980) is a Guatemalan-American film and television composer best known for Destiny 2, Disney's Secrets Of Sulphur Springs, Telemundo's Malverde: El Santo Patron, You, Me and the Apocalypse, The Lying Game, and Transformers: Dark of the Moon. He has also composed scores for multiple studio films and network television shows.

== Early life and influences ==
Schlosser was born in Guatemala City, Guatemala to a Dutch mother and Costa Rican father of German descent, who introduced him to jazz and classical music at a young age. He cites opera, musicals and Disney films as his earliest influences. During his childhood, his family lived and traveled between Guatemala, Austria, Panama, and Costa Rica, enabling him to expand his musical vocabulary. While living in Austria, he began singing in choirs and learned to play the piano. After moving to Panama, he began singing in a Swedish choir which sang in Spanish, English, French, German, and Swedish. He began learning saxophone and, after moving to Costa Rica, playing in symphonic bands, youth orchestra, and small jazz ensembles.

During high school, he bought the music software Cakewalk Pro Audio and began composing his own music. While graduating from the German high school in Costa Rica, Schlosser wrote a song inspired by Pat Metheny Group. The Latin Grammy Award-winning world music group Editus, who was recording an album with songs by Costa Rican composers, included Schlosser's work in their album Calle Del Viento.

He attended the Berklee College of Music in Boston on a partial scholarship, where he completed a double major in Film Scoring and Music Production and Engineering. He then relocated to Los Angeles to pursue a career in film composition.

== Career ==
Schlosser began his career in Hans Zimmer's studio Remote Control Productions, through the connections he made while working at The Record Plant in Hollywood, in which he met Alan Myerson. He worked for five years alongside Steve Jablonsky on multiple films and television series, including The Amityville Horror, The Island, The Texas Chainsaw Massacre: The Beginning, Desperate Housewives, Friday the 13th, and the Transformers film series. While working for Steve Jablonsky, Schlosser contributed additional music and conducted a small orchestra while recording the score for all nine seasons of Desperate Housewives.

In 2014, Schlosser was one of over a hundred people who were given the ASCAP Award for Top Television Series for his work on Freeform's The Lying Game.

In 2015, he composed the score for NBC's You, Me and the Apocalypse. During that same year, he also worked with the Costa Rica National Symphony Orchestra and arranged a full orchestral performance of his original music in collaboration with Editus. In 2017, he scored the film What About Love starring Sharon Stone and Andy Garcia. In 2018, the IMAX film In Saturn's Rings for which he composed the opening music is set to be released.

Schlosser has also composed scores for video games, including Destiny 2, Gears of War 2, and Gears of War 3, The Sims 3, and Transformers: The Game.

== Filmography / Discography ==
=== Films ===
Year	Title	Role	Notes
2004	Team America: World Police	Assistant (Daumen Kaiser)	
2004	Steamboy	Assistant to Composer, Music Editor (temp score)	
2005	Day Shift	Re-recording Mixer	Short Film
2005	The Amityville Horror	Technical Score Advisor, Assistant (Steve Jablonsky)	
2005	The Island	Assistant (Steve Jablonsky)	
2006	The Quick and the Undead	Composer	
2006	The Texas Chainsaw Massacre: The Beginning	Assistant (Steve Jablonsky)	
2006	Desperate Housewives Special: All the Juicy Details	Composer (additional music)	TV movie
2007	I Hate Musicals	Additional Music Programmer, Composer (additional music)	Short Film
2007	The Hitcher	Additional Music Programmer, Composer (additional music)	
2007	The Fiesta Grand	Musician (saxophone)	
2007	Transformers	Technical Score Engineer	
2007	Dark Mirror	Composer	
2007	Dragon Wars: D-War	Assistant to Composer	
2008	Space Chimps	Composer (additional music)	
2008	Forever Strong	Composer (additional music)	
2009	Arrhythmia	Composer	Short Film
2009	Appointment in Vancouver	Composer	
2009	Friday the 13th	Composer (additional music)	
2009	Coyote County Loser	Composer	
2009	The People Speak	Composer (additional music), Musician (sax, Indian flute, keyboard)	
2011	Transformers: Dark of the Moon	Music Programmer	
2013	Zombie Hunter	Composer (additional music)	
2014	The Swan Princess: A Royal Family Tale	Composer (additional music)	
2014	Mr Maple Leaf	Composer (original music by)	Short Film
2015	Pass the Salt	Composer	Short Film
2015	Invisible Sister	Composer (additional music)	TV movie
2016	The Girl in the Pink Motel	Composer	Short Film
2017	Perception	Composer	Short Film
2017	Type A	Composer	TV movie
2018	In Saturn's Rings	Composer (opening music)	
2024	What About Love	Composer (original music by)	

=== Television ===
Year	Title	Role	Notes
2003	SD Gundam Force	Score Recordist	
2005	Threshold	Composer	
2006	Amas de casa desesperadas	Composer (additional music)	TV mini-series 19 episodes
2005-07	The Contender	Assistant (Steve Jablonsky)	
2002-11	Spooks	Composer (additional music)	
2010-11	Life Unexpected	Composer (additional music)	26 episodes
2004-12	Desperate Housewives	Composer (additional music)	169 episodes
2012	The Client List	Co-Composer	10 episodes
2011-13	The Lying Game	Composer, M.C., Composer (additional music)	30 episodes Won: ASCAP Award for Top Television Series
2013	Showville	Composer	8 episodes
2014	Resurrection	Composer (additional music)	3 episodes
2014	Agents of S.H.I.E.L.D.	Composer (additional music)	2 episodes
2015	The Astronaut Wives Club	Composer (additional music)	8 episodes
2015	You, Me and the Apocalypse	Composer	9 episodes
2016	Superhuman	Composer (theme music)	TV special
2021	Secrets of Sulphur Springs		

=== Video games ===
Year	Title	Role	Notes
2007	Transformers: The Game	Composer (additional music)	
2008	Gears of War 2	Composer (additional music)	
2009	The Sims 3	Composer (additional music)	
2011	Gears of War 3	Composer (additional music)	
2017	Destiny 2	Composer	

== Awards and nominations ==
=== ASCAP Awards ===
Year	Nominee / work	Award	Result
2014	Freeform's The Lying Game	ASCAP Award for Top Television Series	Won
