= Red Billabong =

- Theatrical Poster
- Directed by: Luke Sparke
- Written by: Luke Sparke
- Produced by: Carly Imrie
- Starring: Dan Ewing; Tim Pocock; Sophie Don; Jessica Green; Ben Chisholm; John Reynolds; Gregory J. Fryer; Felix Williamson
- Cinematography: Andrew Conder
- Edited by: Michael Gilbert
- Music by: Jason Fernandez
- Production company: SparkeFilms
- Distributed by: Pinnacle Films
- Release date: 25 August 2016 (Australia)
- Running time: 113 minutes
- Country: Australia
- Language: English

Red Billabong is a 2016 Australian independent horror thriller film, written and directed by Luke Sparke in his feature debut. Based on an Australian legend, Red Billabong follows two estranged brothers who find themselves stalked by a supernatural creature.

The movie premiered in Sydney on 10 August 2016, and had a wider Australian release on 25 August 2016.

== Plot ==
In the Australian Outback, two estranged brothers discover old secrets and family lies when their grandfather's property is passed into their hands. When a shady land developer shows interest in taking the property off their hands for a princely sum, Tristan (Pocock) wants to sell up, but Nick (Ewing) is concerned about a warning from grandad's friend, Mr. Garvey. Tristan's friends, including Nick's ex Anya, and drug dealer BJ, show up for a party in the brothers' new home. As both brothers are pulled apart by different choices, one thing is clear – something sinister is going on. As their friends start to go missing they fear they are being stalked by something. An ancient Australian legend has now been unleashed.

== Cast ==
- Dan Ewing as Nick
- Tim Pocock as Tristan
- Sophie Don as Anya
- Jessica Green as Rebecca
- Ben Chisholm as BJ
- John Reynolds as Sam
- Emily Joy as Kate
- James Striation as Jason
- Col Elliott as Clyde
- Gregory J. Fryer as Garvey
- Felix Williamson as Mr Richards

== Production ==
Shooting for the film began in September 2014 in Gold Coast, Queensland. A trailer was released in September 2015.

== Reception ==
In a review for The Reel Bits, Richard Gray said, "Red Billabong is not just a horror film, but a riddle to be solved within the framework of a typical splatterfest."

== Devil Beneath ==
The film was recut and rereleased in 2023 as Devil Beneath.
