= Beast No More =

2018 horror film

Beast No More is a 2018 Australian horror film starring Dan Ewing and Jessica Tovey. The story revolves around Mary Jane (Tovey) a young biologist who focuses on lepidoptery. Tragedy strikes and Mary Jane's world is disturbingly turned upside down. Fleeing the troubled "real world" she embarks upon a solitary bush project. In the isolated and surreal landscape Mary Jane starts experiencing strange phenomena. The opportunity to be a mother again presents itself, only it comes at a cost for Mary Jane and what's left of her family.

The film was directed by Aaron Warwick was written by Matthew J Schelle and written and produced by Jennifer Van Gessel who wrote the prequel comic titled Beast No More Metamorphosis. It was shot during July 2016 and January 2017 on the Central Coast and in Berrima, New South Wales.

== Cast ==
- Jessica Tovey as Mary Jane
- Dan Ewing
- Roy Billing as Gus
