= Rise of the Lonestar Ranger =

2014 film

The Last Duane
- Directed by: Chris Ekstein
- Produced by: Stacy Ekstein
- Starring: Jason Patric; Danny Trejo; Rose McGowan; Keith David; Martin Copping.
- Release date: March 6, 2014

The Last Duane is a 2014 American Western film directed by Chris Ekstein and starring Jason Patric, Danny Trejo, Rose McGowan, Keith David, and Martin Copping. The film was produced by Stacy Ekstein.

== Plot ==
Buck Duane inherited his legendary father's skill with a gun as well as his knack for finding trouble. Attacked by a jealous rival over a girl, Buck defends himself and is forced to live as an outlaw, constantly on the run from the black and white justice of the Texas Rangers. But when he seeks redemption by rescuing an enslaved Indian girl from a vicious criminal and his gang of outlaws, he's pushed into further violence, and the understanding that he may be no better than the worst of them. As penance for his crimes and the deaths he's caused, Buck agrees to give himself over to service in the Texas Rangers, working in constant peril as a sanctioned vigilante. He lives as an outlaw in order to root them out, dealing justice and vengeance for his dead friends and all the weak and helpless folk of Texas.

== Cast ==
- Jason Patric as Kip Duane
- Danny Trejo as Espada
- Rose McGowan as Madeline
- Keith David as Euchre
- Mark Boone Junior as Gus Andrews
- Martin Copping as Kid Fuller
- Marisa Coughlan as Mary Duane
- Anthony De Longis as Jeff Ake
- Jeff Daniel Phillips as Sol White
- Noah Harden as Young Buck Duane
- Kari Nissena as Annabelle
- Ardeshir Radpour as Gang Member
- Clay Walker as Ranger Perkins
- Lori Mixson as Eleanor Bain
- Mary E. Fry as The Proper Lady
- Angela Francis as Saloon Girl
- David Lee Jensen as Jack Rabbit Benson
- Laura Lee as Proper Lady

== See also ==
- List of western films
