= Godless: The Eastfield Exorcism =

2023 Australian horror film

- Promotional release poster
- Directed by: Nick Kozakis
- Written by: Alexander Angliss-Wilson
- Produced by: Lauren Simpson; Timothy Whiting; Tony Coombs
- Starring: Georgia Eyers; Dan Ewing; Tim Pocock; Rosie Traynor; Eliza Matengu
- Cinematography: Carl Allison
- Music by: Dmitri Golovko
- Production companies: Visible Studios; Harvest Pictures Group; Iris Arc Pictures
- Distributed by: XYZ Films; Tubi; Umbrella Entertainment
- Release dates: 8 March 2023 (Philippines); 14 August 2023 (Australia)
- Running time: 92 minutes
- Country: Australia
- Language: English

Godless: The Eastfield Exorcism (also known as In God's Care) is a 2023 Australian horror film directed by Nick Kozakis and written by Alexander Angliss-Wilson. It stars Georgia Eyers, Dan Ewing, Tim Pocock, Rosie Traynor and Eliza Matengu.

Godless: The Eastfield Exorcism premiered in the Philippines on 8 March 2023, before having its world premiere at the 2023 Overlook Film Festival. It was released on video-on-demand (VOD) and digital platforms in North America on 6 April 2023 and it received a positive reviews from critics.

== Cast ==
- Georgia Eyers as Lara
- Dan Ewing as Ron Levonde
- Tim Pocock as Daniel
- Rosie Traynor as Barbara
- Eliza Matengu as Dr. Marsa Walsh
- John Wood as Detective Chambers
- Ella Bourne as Allie Johnston
- Sunny S. Liston as Lance
- Carlia Capozza as Officer Kim Jones
- Hugh Sexton as Plumber

== Production ==
Filming took place in the Shire of Hepburn in Victoria, Australia, in November and December 2021.

== Release ==
On 2 March 2023, it was announced that XYZ Films had acquired the North American distribution rights to Godless: The Eastfield Exorcism. An official trailer for the film was released on YouTube on 7 March 2023.

Godless: The Eastfield Exorcism premiered in the Philippines on 8 March 2023, playing at SM Cinema theatres. The film had its world premiere at the Overlook Film Festival in New Orleans, Louisiana, United States, between 30 March and 2 April 2023. It was released on video-on-demand (VOD) and digital platforms in North America on 6 April 2023.

== Reception ==
On Rotten Tomatoes, the film has an approval rating of 85% based on 13 reviews. Natalia Keogan of Filmmaker praised Georgia Eyers's performance and wrote that, "It's interesting to see a horror film, call out dangerous religious rites instead of sensationalizing them—and even more so for one that's 'based on true events' (a case from 1994) to present tangible facts in lieu of obscuring them to create a more compelling narrative." Bloody Disgusting's Meagan Navarro gave the film a score of two out of five, criticizing its narrative as "stripped bare of anything outside its path toward exorcism-induced destruction" and its sound design as "overblown"; she called the film "effectively uncomfortable" but referred to it as "less successful in its attempts to infuse a fictional horror movie with true crime."
