= In Saturn's Rings =

- In Saturn's Rings poster
- Directed by: Stephen V. Stone (formerly Stephen van Vuuren)
- Narrated by: LeVar Burton
- Music by: Ferry Corsten; William Orbit; Samuel Barber; Siddhartha Barnhoorn; Pieter A. Schlosser (opening music)
- Release date: May 4, 2018
- Running time: 42 minutes
- Country: United States

In Saturn's Rings is a large format movie about Saturn made exclusively from real photographs taken by spacecraft. Director Stephen V. Stone used more than 7.5 million photographs and numerous film techniques to create the effect of flying through space around Saturn and among its rings. CGI and 3-D modeling were not used in any capacity to create the realistic feel Stone wanted for the viewer's experience. Most of the photos were taken by various major space missions.

The film was originally expected to be released on December 31, 2014. It was scheduled for release on May 4, 2018, to coincide with Star Wars Day. The 45-minute film was released in four formats:

- Native unmodified fulldome with true fulldome camera field-of-view.
- Dome-optimized master for digital (8K and 4K resolution) and 15/70.
- Flat-screen, 1.33-ratio, 4K giant screen version digital and 15/70.
- Digital cinema 4K/2K in flat aspect ratio.

== Background ==
Sparked by Cassini's arrival at Saturn in 2004 and the media's lack of coverage, Stone produced two art films about space exploration. Photos from space missions — including images of Saturn taken by Cassini — were included. But Stone was not satisfied with the results so did not release them.

While listening to the Adagio for Strings by Samuel Barber one day in 2006, Stone conceived the idea of creating moving images of Saturn based on a pan-and-scan 2.5-D effect they had seen in the 2002 documentary The Kid Stays in the Picture. The technique involves creating a 3-D perspective using still photographs. (The Adagio for Strings would later become part of the soundtrack for In Saturn's Rings.)

== Outside In (2004–2012) ==
After having success with a black-and-white HD animation of Saturn images from the Cassini mission based on The Kid Stays in the Picture effect, Stone wrote a script for a 12-minute film about why space should be explored. They envisioned the film, which they called Outside In, showing at planetariums, museums, and film festivals.

James Hyder, editor of the large film format journal LF Examiner, learned about Stone's project and told them it belonged on the giant screen. Inspired by Hyder's encouragement as well as a viewing of the IMAX film Magnificent Desolation: Walking on the Moon 3D, Stone committed themselves to making their film in large format.

Stone spent the next three years doing numerous rewrites and reworks of the film. They was unable to create a script using narration in classic documentary format that was able to express what they felt the images were conveying. A fan of the film 2001: A Space Odyssey, directed by Stanley Kubrick, Stone finally found their moment of clarity during their annual viewing of that movie in 2009. "There are only 11 minutes of dialog in 2001's 140 minutes," Stone told LF Examiner in 2012. "I realized what Kubrick and writer Arthur C. Clarke understood: space is universal, primal, infinite. Words simply fail to convey the experience of exploring space."

As a result, Stone eliminated the narration entirely and instead, allows the images and music to give each viewer a personalized experience of Saturn.

== In Saturn's Rings (2012–present) ==
After discussion with audiences at IMAX conferences, Stone decided the film title Outside In was not a good match for the film's sensibility. The Giant Film Cinema Association had been publicizing the film and surveys it conducted supported this. It was during a discussion in 2012 about the film's climax where he was describing Earth "in Saturn's rings" that Stone realized they had found their new title.

A 2013 Kickstarter campaign has raised nearly double the initial $37,500 goal. Much of that amount was used to finance a new recording of Samuel Barber's Adagio for Strings, performed by the Greensboro Symphony Orchestra. (Stone currently resides in Greensboro, North Carolina.)

The film's advisors include Dr. Steve Danford, retired associate professor of physics and astronomy at the University of North Carolina at Greensboro; Dr. Michael J. Malaska, technologist at the Jet Propulsion Laboratory; author and space journalist Andrew Chaikin; and NASA Solar System Ambassadors Tony Rice and Jonathan Ward.

Although narration had originally been removed in 2009, by 2014 Stone realized that a sparse narration was necessary for the film. This amounted to 5 pages and about 1200 words in total. After listening to many voice actors one stood out and he asked LeVar Burton to be the narrator for the film in 2017. LeVar Burton recorded the narration in Los Angeles on 3 February 2018.

== Animation and image processing ==
Stone wanted viewers to feel as if they were flying through space. His biggest challenge was how to do this without having to rely on traditional computer-generated images. Although The Kid Stays in the Picture effect had opened the door to inventive ways of manipulating photographs, Stone did not find it robust enough to tackle Saturn's rings. They experimented with dozens of other techniques both old and new, including the "Bullet Time" effect (e.g. as seen in The Matrix films), which employs multiple still cameras to create variable speeds of motion.

The director determined that only actual photographs would be used, without hand-drawn or computer-generated images (CGI). This required the use of over 7.5 million separate images, captured in space or by telescopes. To present a 3-dimensional effect, images would be composited and moved using multi-plane animation, but no such animation had ever been attempted on this scale. For example, Walt Disney Studios had used this technique with seven layers in films such as Snow White and the Seven Dwarfs, whereas In Saturn's Rings uses up to 1.2 million layers in its most complex sequence.

About 25% of the image processing work is performed using Adobe After Effects. Most of the remaining work is done with Adobe Photoshop, Adobe Bridge, GIMP, and custom-written software.

In Saturn's Rings strives to present an accurate representation of the view which would be seen by a person traveling through space, arriving at Saturn. The film's image processing requires complex mathematics and extremely high-resolution images. Over 30 individuals and groups contributed their efforts to acquiring and processing the images, including Gordan Ugarkovic (largest image donor: Cassini, Huygens, Messenger, LRO), Colin Legg (astrophotographer), Val Klavans (image donor and image processor), Bill Eberly (lead SDSS image processor), Jason Harwell (lead Hubble/ESO image processor), Judy Schmidt (Hubble/ESO image processor) and Ian Regan (lead image processor and donor: Titan/Saturn/Jupiter).

== Image sources ==
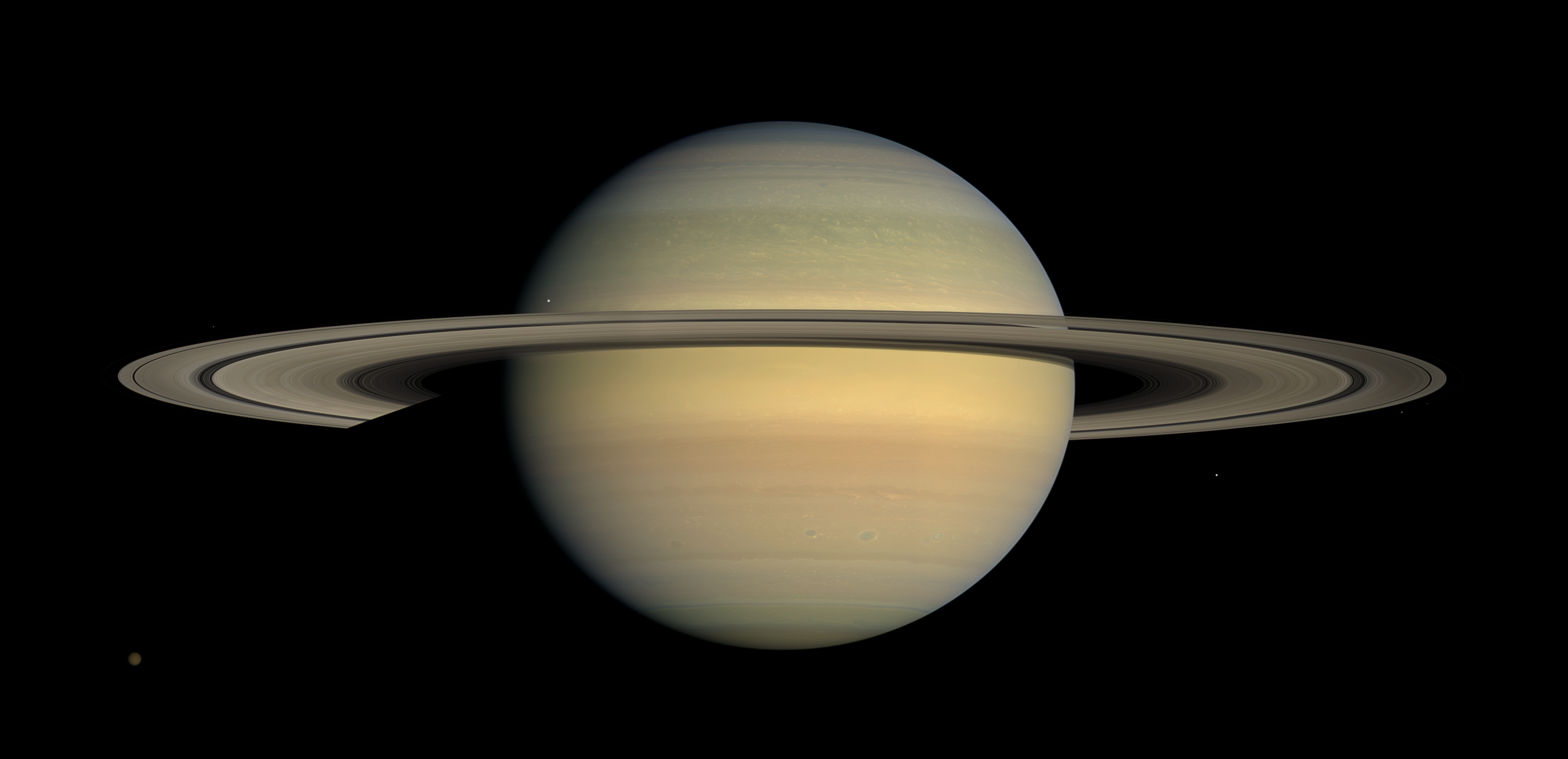
Saturn during Equinox

The film relies primarily on photographs of Saturn and its moons, taken by the Cassini-Huygens probe. A large number of other sources were also used. Many of these images of stars and galaxies were taken from camera locations much closer to Earth, during the crewed Apollo missions and by the Hubble Space Telescope. These images "set the stage" during the film's opening sequences, before the viewer approaches Saturn.

Sources include:

- Cassini-Huygens
- Apollo 8-17
- Lunar Reconnaissance Orbiter (LRO)
- Hubble Space Telescope
- MESSENGER spacecraft
- Suomi NPP (VIIRS)
- Galileo
- Voyager 1 and 2
- Solar Dynamics Observatory (SDO)
- Mars Reconnaissance Orbiter (MRO)
- Venus Express (VEX)
- Rosetta
- Dawn
- Sloan Digital Sky Survey (SDSS)
- U.S. Library of Congress
- Other public historical photographic archives

== Viral video and public support ==
People got their first look at his work when Stone posted a clip from Outside In on Vimeo in late 2010. On March 9, 2011, the science fiction and futurism website io9 posted the clip, which quickly went viral. The clip received hundreds of thousands of views, prompting wide support and new backers for Stone's project. NASA named the clip its Astronomy Picture of the Day (APOD) on March 15 and it was featured on Discovery Canada's Daily Planet television series. Also notable in 2011, Bill Nye posted the clip on his blog, stating: "Outside In plays your dreams right before your eyes. You'll soar past our nearby worlds and see for yourself what these extraordinary places look like up close... Outside In makes you part of our species' extraordinary extraterrestrial journeys."

The film is being produced entirely with volunteer labor, and financed through donations from individuals and groups. It is budgeted at US$265,000 compared to the $6 million typical budget for an IMAX film.

== Distribution and release ==
A distribution agreement was signed in 2013 with BIG & Digital, a boutique distributor of films for museums, attractions and cinemas, specializing in large-screen film formats including IMAX.

On July 1, 2017, filmmaker Stephen V. Stone announced on the official website and via a Facebook Live video the world premiere date of May 4, 2018, with locations to be determined.

During the COVID-19 pandemic alert, authors let theaters show the film freely under certain conditions.

On July 31, 2024, the film and filmmaker announced on Facebook, Instagram and the official website that they had secured all rights to the film fully from BIG and Digital, LLC and Reef Distribution. It was also announced that the film will be self-distributed.

== In popular culture ==
In late 2017, Canadian singer Bryan Adams released a music video making extensive use of footage from In Saturn's Rings. The song, "Please Stay", is from Adams' album Ultimate. Adams also directed the video.
