= Lightning Point =

2012 Australian television series

- Also known as: Alien Surf Girls
- Genre: Teen drama; Science fiction; Fantasy
- Created by: Jonathan M. Shiff
- Written by: Simon Butters; Sam Carroll; Carine Chai; Max Dann; David Hannam; Anthony Morris; Chris Roache
- Directed by: Colin Budds; Evan Clarry
- Starring: Philippa Coulthard; Lucy Fry; Jessica Green; Kenji Fitzgerald; Paige Houden; Andrew James Morley
- Theme music composer: Pete Dacy & Jason Bond
- Composers: Ricky Edwards; Ric Formosa
- Country of origin: Australia
- Original language: English
- No. of seasons: 1
- No. of episodes: 26

Production
- Executive producers: Jonathan M. Shiff; Julia Adams; Nicole Keeb; Arne Lohmann; Cherrie Bottger
- Producers: Jonathan M. Shiff; Stuart Wood
- Production locations: Gold Coast, Queensland, Byron Bay, New South Wales
- Cinematography: Zenon Sawko
- Running time: 25 minutes
- Production company: Jonathan M. Shiff Productions

Original release
- Network: Network Ten; Nickelodeon Australia
- Release: 22 June – 14 December 2012

Lightning Point (also known as Alien Surf Girls) is an Australian science fantasy teen drama television series created and co-produced by Jonathan M. Shiff. The show was filmed on location at the Gold Coast and Byron Bay in 2011. The half-hour series was produced by Shiff for Network Ten in association with Nickelodeon Australia and German public broadcaster ZDF, with investment from Screen Australia and Screen Queensland. It was distributed worldwide by ZDF Enterprises. It premiered on Network Ten in Australia on 22 June 2012, and was rebroadcast on the same network from 5 July 2014.

The series premiered on TeenNick in the United States under its international title, Alien Surf Girls on 29 May 2012, and aired on Nickelodeon in the United Kingdom on 23 July 2012 under the same name.

In January 2013, co-star Jessica Green confirmed on Twitter (now known as X) that the series would not return for a second season.

== Premise ==
Zoey and Kiki, two girls from the distant planet Lumina, get stranded in the quiet Australian seaside town of Lightning Point after losing their spaceship. When the town starts experiencing a series of UFO sightings, the girls realise they may not be the first intergalactic visitors on planet Earth.

== Production ==
=== Development and filming ===
Lightning Point was announced in late 2010 by Jonathan M. Shiff Productions, described as a "retro surfing sci-fi" series. The series was produced in association with ZDF, Network Ten, and Nickelodeon Australia, with investment from Screen Australia and Screen Queensland. Filming began on 8 November 2010 at Village Roadshow Studios on Queensland's Gold Coast, with additional location filming at Byron Bay, New South Wales.

Hundreds of teenagers nationally auditioned for the lead roles. Producer Jonathan Shiff stated: "We're really excited to be helping our young audience discover a new series of retro surfing sci-fi. It will be something quite different and a lot of fun!"

The series was filmed in 2011, consisting of 26 half-hour episodes. It was shot by director of photography Zenon Sawko.

=== Casting ===
The series launched the careers of several young Australian actors. Philippa Coulthard was cast as Amber Mitchell while completing Year 12 at Hillbrook Anglican School in Brisbane. Lucy Fry and Jessica Green were cast as the alien visitors Zoey and Kiki, respectively. Green, who was born in Tasmania, had previously appeared in small roles in Peter Pan and Aquamarine before landing her first major lead role in the series.

== Characters ==
=== Main ===
- Amber Mitchell (Philippa Coulthard) – Amber grew up in Lightning Point, and leads a regular life until two alien girls, Zoey and Kiki from the planet Lumina, turn to her for help. Despite Amber's efforts to help them keep a low profile, the two seem to attract attention everywhere they go. Amber lives with her mother, who works as a police sergeant, and their dog, Piper. She is close friends with Luca but doesn't share his obsession with aliens. When she's not teaching Zoey and Kiki how to act more human, Amber teaches younger kids how to surf.
- Zoey (Lucy Fry) – Zoey is intelligent, bold, and impulsive, making it difficult for her to blend in on Earth. She wants to be in control of every situation, something that is challenging on an unfamiliar planet. A natural competitor, she thrives on challenges, constantly pushing herself to the limit as a daredevil surfer. She immediately catches the attention of Brandon, the local surf star, and makes her first Earth enemy—his girlfriend, Madison.
- Kiki (Jessica Green) – Kiki is new to both Lightning Point and Earth. Sensitive and curious, she's fascinated by Lightning Point, and wants to experience everything it has to offer. She loves connecting with nature, especially on a surfboard, and getting to know the local creatures, human and otherwise. She wants to understand what it really means to be human. She often feels homesick for Lumina, but when she starts to grow closer romantically with Amber's best friend Luca, she realizes that staying on Earth a little longer might not be a bad idea.
- Luca Benedict (Kenji Fitzgerald) – Luca is a bit of an outsider in Lightning Point. He doesn't surf, and he has a keen interest in extraterrestrial alien life, which makes him an easy target for Brandon and his friends. It seems that Amber is the only person who really understands Luca, because they have been best friends and neighbors since they were young. When Zoey and Kiki arrive, Luca notices strange signs of alien activity and becomes determined to uncover the truth. But as Kiki and Luca grow closer romantically, Luca's conviction about the presence of aliens becomes stronger.
- Madison (Paige Houden) – Madison considers herself the hottest girl in Lightning Point, so she's not thrilled when two beautiful surfers named Kiki and Zoey show up on her turf. Madison is used to getting what she wants, and she's not about to let anything threaten her place in the social hierarchy. When Madison senses romantic sparks between her boyfriend, Brandon, and Zoey, she'll do anything to make Zoey look bad.
- Brandon Benedict (Andrew James Morley) – Outgoing and popular, Brandon is a local celebrity. He's the best surfer in town—although Zoey's arrival in Lightning Point could change that. Brandon is fascinated by the mysterious new girl and her impressive surfing skills, and his girlfriend Madison takes an instant dislike to Zoey. He was adopted by the Benedicts after his parents died in a boating accident when he was a child. Brandon teases his brother Luca for believing in UFOs and space aliens.

=== Recurring ===
- Olivia Mitchell (Simone Bennett-Smith) – the local Police Sergeant and Amber's mother.
- Liam (Reece Milne) – Brandon's friend and rival to Amber, Kiki, and Zoey.
- Gina (Da Yen Zheng) – Madison's best friend.
- Mia (Lia Fisher) – the owner of the local diner. She is from the United States.
- Josh (Erin Mullally) – a boy who Amber has a crush on. He has a little brother named Sean.
- Mr. Phillips (Anthony Standish) – a high school teacher.
- Piper the Dog (Java) – the local police dog and Amber's pet.
- Bandit the Horse (Elmo) – Luca's horse. Kiki has a liking for him.

== Episodes ==
No. overall	No. in season	Title	Directed by	Written by	Australia release date	U.S. release date	Prod. code
1	1	"Wipeout"	Colin Budds	David Hannam	22 June 2012	29 May 2012	101
Zoey and Kiki land in Lightning Point; Luca finds the key to Zoey and Kiki's ship; Zoey and Kiki enlist Amber's help to retrieve the key to their ship.
2	2	"Microwave"	Colin Budds	Anthony Morris	29 June 2012	30 May 2012	102
Kiki and Zoey are stranded on Earth. Zoey realizes that not everyone is happy to see new faces in town. When Zoey and Kiki are near a microwave, they revert to their true alien plasma ball form.
3	3	"Wires Crossed"	Colin Budds	Simon Butters	6 July 2012	31 May 2012	103
Kiki and Zoey use the school satellite dish to send an alien signal; Amber must stop the school from being overrun by canines.
4	4	"Feelings"	Colin Budds	Sam Caroll	13 July 2012	4 June 2012	104
Zoey experiences anger for the first time when Brandon steals her wave
5	5	"Good Vibrations"	Colin Budds	Anthony Morris	20 July 2012	5 June 2012	105
Quadrupeds (horses) fascinate Kiki and when she finds out that Luca's horse Bandit has been skittish and dangerous to ride ever since they arrived, she feels terrible.
6	6	"Crushed"	Colin Budds	Max Dann	27 July 2012	6 June 2012	106
Luca asks Kiki out on a romantic date. But Kiki fears that getting romantically closer to Luca will force her to reveal her secret as an alien being from the planet Lumina.
7	7	"Alien Abduction"	Colin Budds	David Hannam	3 August 2012	7 June 2012	107
Zoey is trapped in a storm; Amber and Kiki search for a way to free Zoey from the storm.
8	8	"Risky Business"	Colin Budds	Sam Carroll	10 August 2012	11 June 2012	108
Madison challenges Zoey to a competition at Lightning Point's most dangerous surfing spot; Zoey wipes out and morphs into her alien form.
9	9	"The Cane Field"	Colin Budds	Simon Butters	17 August 2012	12 June 2012	109
Zoey and Kiki access a strange energy field and cause a massive crop circle to form; Luca believes that he has proof that aliens exist.
10	10	"Circle of Friends"	Colin Budds	Sam Carroll	24 August 2012	13 June 2012	110
With Luca Benedict and Brandon Benedict dangerously close to their secret, Kiki feels that they have no choice but to stick close to them, to find out what they really know.
11	11	"Close Encounter"	Colin Budds	Max Dann	31 August 2012	14 June 2012	111
As Kiki spends time with Luca, she begins to feel more human; Zoey tries to send a signal home.
12	12	"Kiki Revealed"	Colin Budds	Anthony Morris	7 September 2012	18 June 2012	112
When a storm is forecast to hit Lightning Point, Zoey and Kiki know it's time – they can send a signal through the lightning, via the energy field and back to Lumina.
13	13	"Spaceship"	Colin Budds	Chris Roache	14 September 2012	19 June 2012	113
Kiki and Zoey are anxious – with no reply from Lumina and Luca knowing who they are, they're no longer safe in Lightning Point. Suddenly, Seargent Mitchell gets a call from the local police station.
14	14	"Distracted"	Evan Clarry	Anthony Morris	21 September 2012	20 June 2012	114
Many weeks after the boat was discovered in the cane field, no clues have been found and no further message from Lumina has come. Zoey is frustrated – so she throws herself into surfing.
15	15	"Poles Apart"	Evan Clarry	Simon Butters	28 September 2012	21 June 2012	115
Amber is totally excited when her crush, Josh has noticed her at school. She's doubly excited when he asks her to help organize a Hawaiian fundraiser party for his basketball team.
16	16	"Family Ties"	Evan Clarry	Max Dann	5 October 2012	21 June 2012	116
When Olivia rings Amber about a surprise waiting at home for her, Amber would never have guessed that the surprise was her dad Keith!
17	17	"Alien Attraction"	Evan Clarry	Carine Chai	12 October 2012	29 October 2012	117
Luca is finally letting his guard down with Kiki again – and soon they're back to their old platonic relationship.
18	18	"See the Light"	Evan Clarry	Sam Carrol	19 October 2012	30 October 2012	118
The gang decide not to let Brandon know about the toy lighthouse until they know more about it – except Zoey, whose growing feelings for Brandon make her more sensitive to his needs to reconnect with his parents' past. What harm could it do?
19	19	"Vanished"	Evan Clarry	Sam Carrol	26 October 2012	31 October 2012	119
Brandon and Zoey are closer than ever and are keen to spend as much time together as possible.
20	20	"Power Up"	Evan Clarry	Sam Carrol	2 November 2012	1 November 2012	120
Kiki and Zoey are relieved to find out that half-Luminan Brandon can't use the card properly. The only way they can be sure they are out of danger though, is to destroy the card.
21	21	"Heartbreak"	Evan Clarry	Simon Butters	9 November 2012	7 November 2012	121
With Brandon fully charged, Zoey can't help but feel that Brandon needs to know the truth about her.
22	22	"Connections"	Evan Clarry	Anthony Morris	16 November 2012	7 November 2012	122
Brandon is furious with everyone – and especially Zoey – for lying to him. How could they keep a secret like this from him?
23	23	"Surf's Up"	Evan Clarry	Max Dann	23 November 2012	14 November 2012	123
The day of the Lightning Point Junior Girls Surfing Competition is here and everyone from Lightning Point is ready to compete.
24	24	"Meltdown"	Evan Clarry	Sam Carrol	30 November 2012	14 November 2012	124
Brandon is so excited by his alien energy that he starts to recharge – way too often. Suddenly, in the Diner, Brandon can't help but radiate energy out into the atmosphere – which starts to affect the Diner in supernatural ways.
25	25	"Investigation"	Evan Clarry	David Hannam	7 December 2012	21 November 2012	125
Brandon is finally ready to learn who he truly is. As Zoey speaks to him, she becomes more and more convinced that Brandon has secrets locked inside his memories.
26	26	"Flight"	Evan Clarry	Chris Roache	14 December 2012	21 November 2012	126
It's an emotional farewell between Brandon and Zoey before the real battle starts –getting Kiki and Zoey onto the boat and out to the ship. While Brandon creates an extraterrestrial diversion, Kiki and Zoey sail the boat to the lighthouse with Luca and Amber's help.

- A compilation movie has been made representing the series with scenes pertaining to the series' overall story arc and was broadcast on Nickelodeon Australia on 24 February 2013.

=== Home media and streaming ===
The series is available for purchase on Amazon Prime Video (under the title Alien Surf Girls) and Apple TV. In Germany, the series is available to stream via ZDF's on-demand services ZDF select and ZDFtivi on Amazon Prime Video Channels.

The full series is also available to watch for free on YouTube, with official playlists in both English and German having been published. Additional language playlists are also available on the platform.

A compilation film condensing the series' main story arc was broadcast on Nickelodeon Australia on 24 February 2013.
