= Martin Copping =

Australian actor

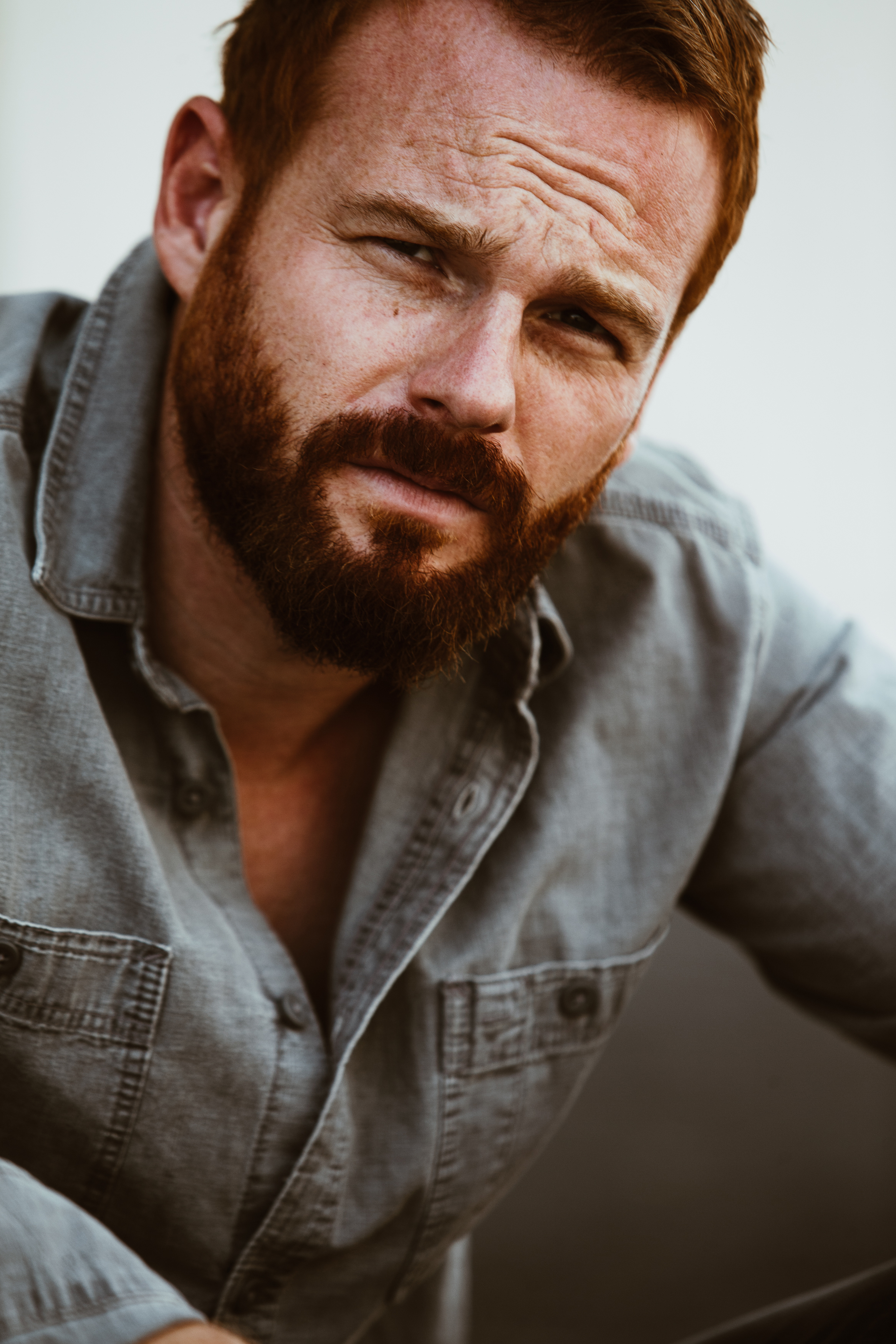
- Born: Peter Martin Copping; 1 November 1977 (age 48); Melbourne, Australia
- Occupation: Actor
- Years active: 1977–present
- Parent: Robin Copping (father)

Peter Martin Copping (born 1 November 1977) is an Australian film, television, theater and video game actor best known for his role as the title character in the exploitation film homage Zombie Hunter, the voice of Mozzie in Rainbow Six: Siege and a starring role as 2Lt. Lucas Riggs of the Australian Army 20th Battalion in Call of Duty: Vanguard. Copping is also known for his roles of Cpl. Richard Jennings in Forbidden Ground.

== Filmography ==
=== Film ===
Year	Title	Role	Notes
2019	The Last Full Measure	Slade	Feature film
2019	The Refuge	Zander	Film
2018	#AiFUpload		TV short
2018	Beerfest: Thirst for Victory	McGuinley	TV film
2018	Disillusioned	Ron	TV film
2018	Mistress Hunter	Karl	TV film
2018	A Lesson in Cruelty	Sid	Film
2017	Safety First		Short film
2016	Jean	Voice of the Wild (voice)	Film
2015	Machine Gun Kelly: World Series	Jason Statham (voice)	Short film
2015	The Right Hand of God	Alexander Pike	Short film
2015	Shadow May Lie	Jack	Short film
2014	Rise of the Lonestar Ranger	Kid Fuller	Feature film
2013	Amnesia	Craig	Short film
2013	Forbidden Ground	Cpl. Richard Jennings	Feature film
2013	Zombie Hunter	Hunter	Direct to video film
2013	Elegy for a Revolutionary	Jeremy James	Short film
2012	Reboot	Bren	Short film
2012	Pineapples	Craig	Short film
2012	Blame the Rain	Taxi Driver	Short film
2012	Victory Blvd	Jack	Film
2011	Sheep Impact	Craig	Short film
2010	Shadow's Heart	Dane	Short film
2008	When I Grow Up I Want to Be White	Red	Short film
2008	The Countdown	Max	Short film
2007	Platform 4	Frederick	Short film
2006	Number 2	Richard (voice)	Short film
2005	Jackpot	Jerry	Short film
2004	Bereave It or Not	Drake	Short film
2000	On the Beach	Beans	TV film
1997	Amy	Groupie	Feature film
1982	The Pirate Movie	McDonald's Customer (uncredited)	Feature film
1978	Patrick	Baby in Hospital (uncredited)	Feature film

=== Television ===
Year	Title	Role	Notes
2023	Scrublands	Craig Landers	TV series, 4 episodes
2019	NCIS	Benny	TV series, episode: "Institutionalized"
2017	Making It	Phil	TV series
2015	Footballer Wants a Wife	Camden	TV series, 6 episodes
2015	Hand of God	Lucky	TV series, episode: "Welcome the Stranger"
2014	Hawaii Five-0	Paul Clayton	TV series, episode: "Ho'oilina"
2010	Lowdown	Flicker	TV series, episode: "Who's Your Baddy?"
2008	Rush	Constable Young	TV series, episodes: #1.1 & 1.11
2008	Mark Loves Sharon	Chip	TV series, episode: "Career Crisis"
2004	Blue Heelers	Boyd Spurling	TV series, 5 episodes
2002	Halifax f.p.	Constable Haig	TV series, episode: "Takes Two"
2000	Eugénie Sandler P.I.	Thargie	TV series, episode: #1.7
2000	Something in the Air	Jimmy Hibberd	TV series, 4 episodes
2000	Stingers	Troy	TV series, episode: "Brilliant Lies"
1997–1999	Neighbours	Andy Sisson / Paul Campbell	TV series, 5 episodes
1998	The Violent Earth	Mr. Best	TV miniseries
1998	Good Guys, Bad Guys	Porter	TV series, 4 episodes
1996–1997	Ocean Girl	Orky	TV series, 8 episodes

=== Video games ===
Year	Title	Role	Notes
2021	Call of Duty: Vanguard	Lucas Riggs (Voice & Performance Capture)	Video game
2019	Rainbow Six: Siege	Max 'Mozzie' Goose (voice)	Video game
2016	Call of Duty: Infinite Warfare	Sipes (voice)	Video game (credited as Peter M Copping)
2025	Death Stranding 2: On the Beach	The Lone Commander (voice)	Video game

== Awards and nominations ==
Year	Group	Award	Film/Show	Result
2013	Filmstock Film Festival	Best Actor	Elegy for a Revolutionary	Won
