= Michael Enright (actor) =

British actor (born 1964)

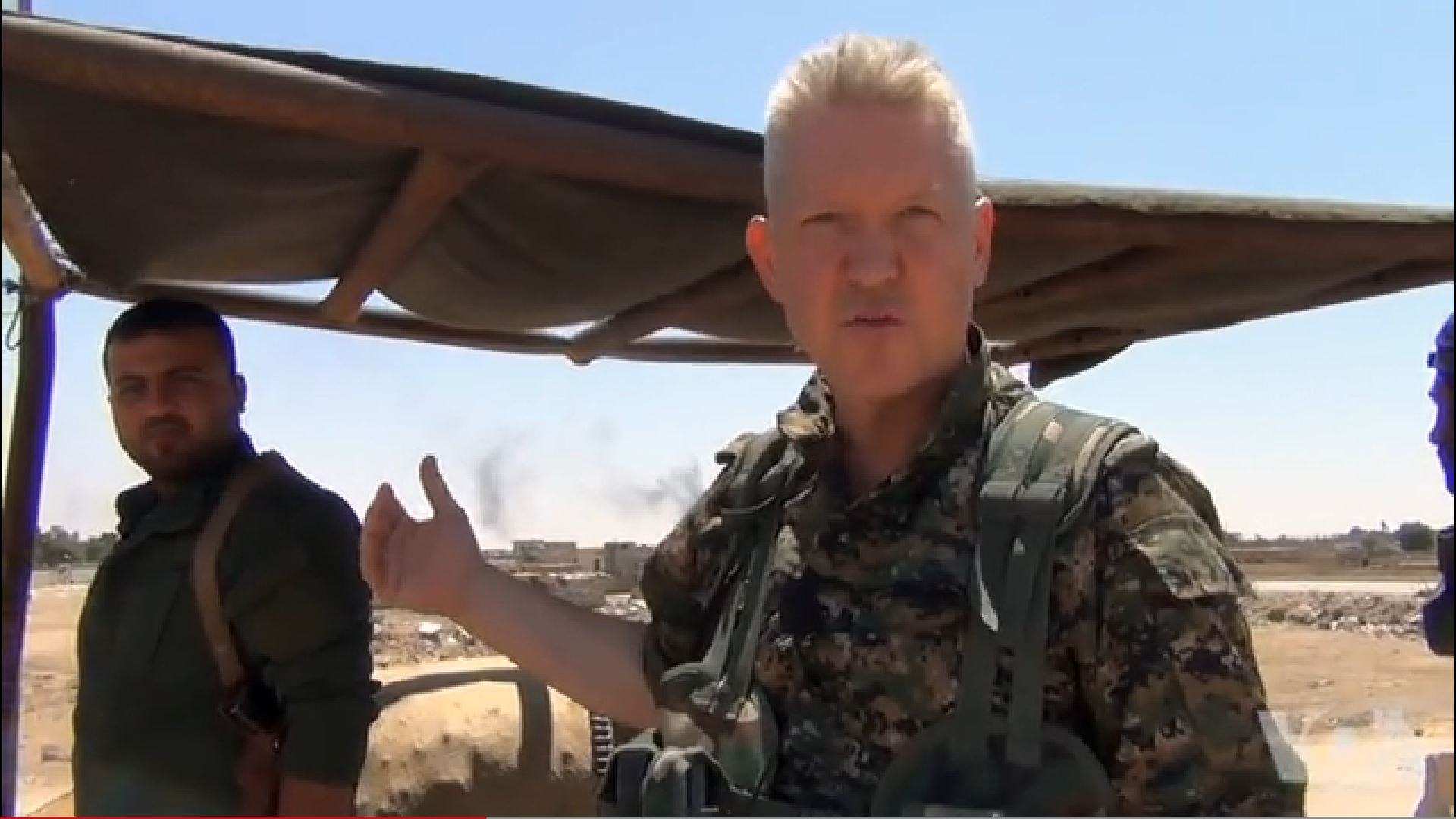
- Enright in YPG uniform, 2015
- Born: 1964 (age 61–62); Manchester, England
- Occupation: Actor
- Military career
- Allegiance: Rojava
- Branch: People's Defense Units
- Service years: 2015–2017
- Rank: Volunteer
- Conflicts: Battle of Raqqa (2017)

Michael Enright (born 1964) is a British actor who has appeared in American film and television productions, including playing supporting characters in Pirates of the Caribbean: Dead Man's Chest and Old Dogs, as well as in several TV series including Agents of S.H.I.E.L.D., Law & Order: LA, CSI: Crime Scene Investigation, Cold Case, Criminal Minds: Suspect Behavior, and Castle. In 2015, Enright joined the Kurdish People's Protection Units as a volunteer to fight ISIL. As of October 2019, he was living in Belize and trying to obtain permission to reenter the United States.

His life is the subject of the 2021 documentary film Heval, which was the first original feature-length film released by Curiosity Stream.

== Early life ==
Enright has stated that he grew up in a tough neighbourhood in Manchester, and that when he was eighteen, his father, who had been diagnosed with cancer, committed suicide. A year later, Enright travelled to the United States, initially going to New York on a tourist visa. He overstayed and began to work at various informal economy jobs, later moving to Los Angeles to pursue acting gigs. In the aftermath of the Rwandan genocide of 1994, he went to Rwanda and volunteered there at an orphanage for some time, before returning to the United States with another tourist visa and overstaying that one as well.

== Acting career ==
Enright was initially cast as a boxer in a soft drink commercial and then appeared as an IRA member on the television series JAG, in 1997.

In the 2000s, he was cast in films including Pirates of the Caribbean: Dead Man's Chest and Old Dogs, as well as several TV series, such as Agents of S.H.I.E.L.D., Law & Order: LA, CSI: Crime Scene Investigation, Cold Case, Criminal Minds: Suspect Behavior, and Castle.

== Kurdish YPG and aftermath ==
Enright joined the Kurdish YPG to fight against ISIS in January 2015, after watching the execution of Jordanian pilot Muath al-Kasasbeh. He contacted the Kurdish People's Protection Units through a British SAS friend and was told to fly to the Iraqi Kurdish city of Sulaymaniyah via Istanbul. According to Enright, he passed physical training in the People's Protection Units and learned to assemble and dismantle a Kalashnikov rifle blindfolded in order to be able to use it at night. Enright was given an AK-47, and fought ISIS on the front lines.

After completing a six-month tour of duty with the YPG, Enright attempted to return to the United States from Mexico via the San Ysidro border crossing south of San Diego, California, but his passport was flagged due to him previously overstaying several tourist visas, as he had lived in the United States for about three decades without authorization. According to Enright, he was kept in a detention facility for six weeks under extreme overcrowded conditions and was then deported to England, but with a verbal offer to be allowed entry if he could help get information on ISIS. He went back with the YPG for an extended eighteen-month tour of duty. After helping to liberate Raqqa (the ISIS capital) in 2017, he left Syria and went to the American embassy in Belize to request permission to reenter the United States.

== Heval ==
On 23 September 2021, American entertainment company Curiosity Stream released the documentary film Heval, its first-ever feature-length production. The film, produced by Jupiter Entertainment, explores the life of Michael Enright and his time serving with the YPG.

== Filmography ==
=== Film ===
List of film appearances, with year, title, and role shown
Year	Title	Role	Notes
1997	The Emissary: A Biblical Epic	Quartas	
1999	Night of Terror	John Homelsman	
2003	Ferrari	Von Hauseman	
2006	Pirates of the Caribbean: Dead Man's Chest	Deckhand – Edinburgh	
2006	National Lampoon's Dorm Daze 2	Russian Drug Dealer #1	
2008	Tony 5	Billy Big time	
2009	Green Street Hooligans 2	Daniel	
2009	The Swing	Rumspringa	short
2009	Old Dogs	Singing Waiter 3	
2010	Knight and Day	Train Engineer	
2011	I Want to Be Me		short
2012	Noah	Hyena (voice)	
2013	Miserable Lesbians	Inspector Crowe	short
2013	Elegy for a Revolutionary	Sersant	short
2014	British Hustle: Ron Jeremy	Mayor Backhander	short
2014	British Hustle	Mayor Backhander	short

=== Television ===
List of television appearances, with year, title, and role shown
Year	Title	Role	Notes
1997	JAG	Rafferty	1 episode
1999–2000	Emily of New Moon	Lieutenant Governor	2 episodes
2002	The Agency	Tim Mckeon	1 episode
2003	Alias	Antonyn Vasilly	1 episode
2005	Wanted	Russian Gangster	1 episode
2005	Kitchen Confidential	Russian Mobster #2	1 episode
2006	CSI: Crime Scene Investigation	Sammy Cutler	1 episode
2009	Cold Case	Ric Yanko '09	1 episode
2010	Castle	Noel Du Preez	1 episode
2010	Make It or Break It	Philippe (uncredited)	2 episodes
2011	Law & Order: LA	Nick Libergal	1 episode
2014	Agents of S.H.I.E.L.D.	Julien Beckers	"A Fractured House"
2017	American Ripper (documentary series)	Recreation actor	2 episodes

== See also ==
- List of armed groups in the Syrian Civil War
- Foreign volunteers in the People's Protection Units
