= Sheep Impact =

2010 short film directed by Brendan Gibbons

- Directed by: Brendan Gibbons
- Written by: Brendan Gibbons
- Starring: Steven Seagal; Martin Copping
- Release date: 2010
- Country: Australia
- Language: English

Sheep Impact is a 2010 Australian short film, starring Steven Seagal and Martin Copping that was made as an advertisement for Carlton & United Breweries. It was shot in Arizona and written and directed by Brendan Gibbons. It was brought about after two promotional commercials, "Snake" and "Sausage" were released on Australian television in late 2011 calling on Australians to submit their "wildest true story" to be made into a film with "Steven Seagal starring as you, playing the lead character". Steven Seagal played the role of 'Paul Wieland' with his best friend 'Craig' played by Martin Copping.

== Cast ==
- Steven Seagal as Paul Wieland
- Martin Copping as Craig

== Plot ==
Two young men Paul Wieland and Craig are heading to a party when they run into some trouble. That trouble revolves around a sheep that Wieland does not want to see die.

== See also ==
- List of Australian films
