= The Quick and the Undead =

2006 film

- Official DVD poster
- Directed by: Gerald Nott
- Written by: Gerald Nott
- Produced by: Gerald Nott
- Starring: Clint Glenn; Parrish Randall; Nicola Giacobbe
- Cinematography: Scott Peck
- Edited by: Jeff Murphy
- Music by: Brian Beardsley; Pieter A. Schlosser
- Distributed by: Anchor Bay Entertainment
- Release date: January 6, 2006
- Running time: 90 minutes
- Country: United States
- Language: English
- Budget: $105,000

The Quick and the Undead is a 2006 Western zombie horror film written, directed, and produced by Gerald Nott.

== Plot ==
In the present, a plague breaks out causing the infected to become zombies. The action starts 80 years later, where the western United States has devolved into a series of ghost towns overrun by zombies. The government awards bounty hunters bounties in exchange for pinkies of the undead.

Ryn Baskin (Clint Glenn) is a bounty hunter. After a successful hunt, he is robbed and left for dead by a rival gang of hunters, led by Blythe Remington (Parrish Randall), who plans to spread the plague, creating a larger bounty market. Ryn survives and follows Remington with the aid of Hans Tubman (Nicola Giacobbe), a foreigner who had double crossed Ryn. This leads him to a final confrontation not just with Blythe, but with a huge zombie army.

== Cast ==
- Clint Glenn as Ryn Baskin
- Erin McCarthy as Hunter Leah
- Dion Day as Jackson
- Nicola Giacobbe as Hans Tubman
- Parrish Randall as Blythe Remington
- Jeff Swarthout as Walters
- Derik Van Derbeken as Dr. Ambroseo
- Toar Campbell as Toar Zombie
- Kim Solow as Little Girl Zombie

== Reception ==
Moria gave the movie two and a half stars, finding it to be a successful, fast-paced blend of the zombie and Spaghetti Western genres. It praised the homages to both Sergio Leone and George A. Romero.
