= Camp (TV series) =

2013 American television series

- Genre: Comedy drama
- Created by: Liz Heldens; Peter Elkoff
- Starring: Rachel Griffiths; Thom Green; Dena Kaplan; Tim Pocock; Charles Grounds; Nikolai Nikolaeff; Lily Sullivan; Charlotte Nicdao; Rodger Corser
- Music by: Tricia Halloran; Matteo Zingales; David McCormack
- Countries of origin: United States; Australia
- Original language: English
- No. of seasons: 1
- No. of episodes: 10

Production
- Executive producers: Gail Berman; Gene Stein; Liz Heldens; Lloyd Braun; Peter Elkoff
- Producers: Jenna Glazier; Jessica Goldberg; Brett Popplewell
- Production locations: Tweed Shire, New South Wales, Australia
- Running time: 43 minutes
- Production companies: BermanBraun; Matchbox Pictures; Selfish Mermaid; Universal Television

Original release
- Network: NBC
- Release: July 10 – September 11, 2013

Camp is a comedy drama television series created by Liz Heldens and Peter Elkoff featuring an all-Australian cast. It follows the antics of a group of campers and counselors at a fictional lakeside summer camp named Little Otter Family Camp, run by director Mackenzie 'Mack' Granger played by Rachel Griffiths. It originally aired on NBC from July 10 through September 11, 2013.

On October 1, 2013, NBC cancelled the series after one season.

== Cast and characters ==
=== Main ===
- Rachel Griffiths as Mackenzie 'Mac' Granger, the camp director
- Thom Green as Kip Wampler, a newly joined uptight counsellor-in-training, whose leukemia has gone into remission for the second time.
- Lily Sullivan as Marina Barker, an outcast newcomer who befriends Kip.
- Tim Pocock as Robbie Matthews, the head of activities, who has just finished college at the University of Virginia and been accepted into Stanford Law School.
- Dena Kaplan as Sarah Brennen, a college student at Stanford and elite swimmer.
- Charles Grounds as Buzz Granger, Mac's son.
- Charlotte Nicdao as Grace, the adopted Asian daughter of Todd and Raffi.
- Nikolai Nikolaeff as David "Cole" Coleman, the camp's maintenance officer.
- Rodger Corser as Roger Shepherd, the director of the rival camp Ridgefield.

=== Recurring ===
- Adam Garcia as Todd, Raffi's partner and Grace's father
- Christopher Kirby as Raffi, Todd's partner and Grace's father
- Genevieve Hegney as Sheila
- Natasha Bassett as Chloe
- Carmel Rose as Zoe
- Isabel Durant as Deanna
- Jordan Rodrigues as Greg
- Liam Hall as Ryan
- Jonathan LaPaglia as Steve, Mac's ex-husband
- Kat Stewart as Robbie's mother
- Jodi Gordon as Kat, Steve's Russian girlfriend
- Juan Pablo Di Pace as Miguel Santos
- Geraldine Hakewill as Kendra Huffington

=== Guests ===
- Guy Edmonds as Cop (1 episode)
- Lani Tupu as Dr Welter (1 episode)
- Rainbow Wedell as a featured extra (1 episode)

== Development and production ==
On January 6, 2013, NBC bypassed the pilot order and green-lighted Camp with a direct-to-series order and a planned summer 2013 airdate. Thirteen episodes were originally ordered, however the episode order was decreased from thirteen to ten due to scheduling. Filming for the series began in Australia in March 2013, and was largely shot around the areas of Murwillumbah and Crams Farm Reserve in Northern New South Wales. The series was created by Liz Heldens and Peter Elkoff, who also serve as executive producers alongside Gail Berman, Lloyd Braun, and Gene Stein.

=== Casting ===
Casting announcements began in February 2013, with Thom Green first to be cast. Green is set to play the role of Kip Wampler, an adorable loner who likes indie rock and documentary films and hates people. Rachel Griffiths, Tim Pocock, and Dena Kaplan were next to come on board the series. Griffiths was cast in the role of Mackenzie Granger, the camp's director, who is reeling from being left by her husband for a younger woman; Pocock is set to play Robbie Matthews, the head of activities at the camp with lofty goals of attending law school, whilst Kaplan will portray Sarah, Robbie's summer romance. Rodger Corser then joined the cast as Roger Shepherd, the director of a rival summer camp. Nikolai Nikolaeff later signed on to the series as David "Cole" Coleman, the camp's food-, sex-, and weed-loving maintenance guy. All of the cast effected American accents for filming.

== Episodes ==
No.	Title	Directed by	Written by	Original release date	U.S. viewers (millions)
1	"Pilot"	Kate Woods	Liz Heldens & Peter Elkoff	July 10, 2013	5.00
After a recent divorce, Mackenzie "Mack" Granger (Rachel Griffiths) opens her summer camp, Camp Little Otter, and tries to run it on her own. Financial struggles cause her to consider a buyout offer from Roger Shepard (Rodger Corser), owner of Camp Ridgefield, the resort across the lake. Mack's son, Buzz (Charles Grounds), is a counselor-in-training and promises a successful summer. Handyman Cole (Nikolai Nikolaeff) helps out, but appears interested in Mack more than her camp. Lead counselors Robbie Matthews (Tim Pocock) and Sarah Brennen (Dena Kaplan) continue their annual summer romance.
2	"Capture the Flag"	Shawn Seet	Liz Heldens	July 17, 2013	4.17
Mack announces the annual "capture the flag" competition. Her ex-husband Steve (Jonathan LaPaglia) arrives, looking for a place to stay for a while and she lets him stay and help. Robbie must assist his mother with her troublesome gambling.
3	"The Mixer"	Shawn Seet	Peter Elkoff	July 24, 2013	3.88
Little Otter prepares for its mixer dance with Camp Ridgefield. Buzz thinks his deejaying the event will improve his reputation with the ladies. Mack hears about a guest family switching to the more-modernized Ridgefield and ponders installing a cell tower.
4	"Valentine's Day in July"	Ben Chessell	Jessica Goldberg	July 31, 2013	3.85
It's Valentine's Day in July, with Valentine-grams and a carnival. Mack must give Roger a private tour of Little Otter, when he wins a raffle. On the tour, they argue, flirt, and eventually succumb to their mutual attraction.
5	"Heat Wave"	Ben Chessell	Kath Lingenfelter	August 7, 2013	3.53
Camp Little Otter gets a record-breaking heat wave and everyone tries their best to keep cool. Buzz's 16th birthday is drawing near and he plans the greatest party the camp has ever seen in his cabin, or so he thinks. Sarah goes to Camp Ridgefield to borrow a generator and she meets her secret crush, Miguel Santos (Juan Pablo Di Pace). Mack is surprised when her ex-husband gives Buzz the night vision goggles she had planned to give him for his birthday. Cole must help her come up a more-perfect birthday gift.
6	"Parents' Weekend"	Nicholas Bufalo	Brent Fletcher	August 14, 2013	3.41
It's the annual CIT Parents' Weekend. Mack must deal with Zoe's (Carmel Rose) high maintenance mother (Neveen Hanna) and Buzz, who doesn't like her punishment for his drinking on his birthday. Roger inadvertently reveals Sarah's secret affair with Miguel. Kip (Thom Green) has a health scare, revealing to the group that he has cancer.
7	"The Wedding"	Nicholas Bufalo	Robia Rashid	August 21, 2013	3.16
When a local official begins issuing marriage licenses to same-sex couples, Mack hosts a wedding for Raffi (Chris Kirby) and Todd (Adam Garcia) at the camp after Grace (Charlotte Nicdao) convinces them to get married there. Roger throws a bachelor party, hoping to attract more gay people to his Ridgefield camp. Kip overcomes his health scare and dumps Chloe (Natasha Bassett), in order to show his true affection to Marina (Lily Sullivan). The governor voids the issued licenses but Raffi and Todd have the ceremony anyway. At the wedding party, Cole makes a move on Mack.
8	"Harvest Moon"	Lynn-Maree Danzey	Joe Lawson	August 28, 2013	3.22
Mack worries about her parents' visit for the Harvest Moon Festival. Mack's dad decides to start a prank war against Camp Ridgefield. Kip helps Marina when she has a pregnancy scare. Robbie learns Sarah is working for Roger.
9	"CIT Overnight"	Lynn-Maree Danzey	Jessica Goldberg	September 4, 2013	3.21
The CITs (counselors-in-training) get ready to spend a night on Bear Mountain. Kip and Marina decide to go public with their relationship. Robbie goes on a journey with French backpackers. Mack learns Cole is thinking about leaving to work for Roger.
10	"Last Days of Summer"	Catriona McKenzie	Dennis Saavedra Saldua & Hayley Tyler	September 11, 2013	3.22
Kip and Marina spend the night together on a blanket in the woods. Buzz and Grace become boyfriend and girlfriend, even though she claims nothing sexual will occur between them. Sarah and Robbie nearly reconcile but remain apart. Cole is Mack's choice from the love triangle, but he decides to take the Alaska job. Marina is in Mack's backseat when she closes the camp and Buzz promises Kip that he will keep an eye on her during the coming school year.

== Critical reception ==
On the review aggregator website Metacritic, the first season has scored 50 out of 100, based on 21 reviews, indicating "mixed or average reviews". Diane Werts from Newsday gave Camp its highest praise: "The characters, scripts and performances are surprisingly smart — almost, dare I say, deep. And you still get the comic humiliations, nasty rivalries and teeny bikinis." Daily News's David Hinckley stated "It takes a village to make a Camp, and watching this crew work to save Little Otter and find summer love is far from the worst thing you could do." James Poniewozik from Time commented "Camp itself reveals a kind of throwback charm, recalling the kind of '70s and '80s summer-movie comedies...that had pathos and real-life problems beneath their water-balloon fights." The Washington Post's Hank Stuever thought the series "lusts after all the pop-culture sleep-away hijinks that preceded it...[t]hen it gets hosed down with the barest minimum of network programming standards." He added, "It's all good, clean fun that is not quite good, not quite clean and not quite fun." Linda Stasi from the New York Post stated, "If you hated summer camp, may I suggest you avoid NBC's horrible new scripted summer series, Camp like a case of poison sumac."
