= Rise (2014 film) =

2014 Australian crime drama film

- Theatrical film poster
- Directed by: Mack Lindon
- Written by: Mack Lindon
- Produced by: Mack Lindon, Amy Jobson, Maya Weidner
- Starring: Martin Sacks; Nathan Wilson
- Cinematography: Geoff McLeod
- Edited by: Jack Higgins; Daniel Warner
- Music by: Jake R. Sanderson
- Production company: Vision Film Australia
- Distributed by: Pinnacle Films
- Release date: 6 November 2014
- Running time: 104 mins
- Country: Australia
- Language: English

Rise is a 2014 Australian crime drama film. It was written and directed by Mack Lindon and stars Nathan Wilson as a man falsely accused of rape. The film is based on Lindon's own experiences.

== Synopsis ==
Based on a true story, Will McIntyre is a young nurse who is falsely accused of rape and is stripped of his career, freedom and is sent to a maximum security prison. Will forms an unlikely friendship with cellmate Jimmy, who is an armed robber, and a prominent lawyer who must compromise wage and status to prove Will's innocence.

== Cast ==
- Nathan Wilson as Will McIntyre
- Martin Sacks as Jimmy Cove
- Marty Rhone as Fung Poi
- Erin Connor as Julie Nile
- David Cuthbertson as Francis Peters
- Vincent B. Gorce as George Spanik
- Jamie Joseph as Butch
- Gemma Laurelle as Constable Rossi
- Andy Aparnon as Benji Knight
- Amanda Dettrick as Barb McIntyre
- John E. Regan as Guard Graham
- Kurt Stowes as Guard Walsh
- Ben Taylor as Tag

Lindon appears as Baxter.

== Background ==
In 2008, Lindon was sentenced to six years in a maximum security prison for the drink-spiking and rape of a 21-year-old woman in February 2006. Lindon originally pled not guilty, and served 19 months in prison. In 2011, the Supreme Court of Victoria overturned his conviction on appeal after a one week retrial.

"Yes I did go home with her and yes we did have sex," he later claimed. "But it was consensual. I will never know why she did it. I have tried to jump in her shoes. It was a small lie that spiralled out of control.... I went from being an ordinary Aussie, a bit of a lad, who was social, didn't mind a drink and loved a surf, to being in a prison where I was constantly looking over my back. There's a whole hierarchy and pecking order. You have to walk a certain way, eat a certain way. One of my rooms was next to (Tony) Mokbel's brother. It was hard. I use to wake up with sweats at night. The stigma that comes with rape. There are lots of people who get beaten and raped in jail with convictions like mine. Your life is at risk all of the time."

== Production ==
While serving time in prison, Lindon decided to turn his ordeal into a feature film. "I was very careful to keep away from the politics of that charge,” says Lindon. “Rise is about life, it’s about life inside and there’s a lot of pressure, you’re in a constant state of paranoia at times looking at your back and you’ve only got you’re word inside so you’ve got to be true to that, which helped me tremendously."

Lindon sought mentoring from Rob Sitch. "I thoroughly enjoyed watching The Castle and I’d heard that he made that on the smell of an oily rag," says McIntyre. "So I wrote to Rob and he replied very quickly with a couple of pages outlining the process ahead of me, breaking it up into steps, which I pretty much followed to a T."

Sitch later said:

I always think that if people write to you in a decent and thoughtful way they deserve a decent and thoughtful response. I said to him if you’ve got a good story that you’ve got to keep testing it and present it in a way that people can visualise. I find it amazing that he’s got the film up. I’m in the cheap seats there – that’s all his effort... It’s the same musical key [as The Castle] in a way: it’s someone fighting and staying resilient. But I’m amazed that having been in jail, which is one of the hardest things to do in life, that he’s got out and picked the second hardest thing to do, which is making a movie! One of the funny things about advice is it’s easy to give it out but it’s not always easy to act on it. So I was very impressed that he followed through.

The film was shot mostly in Ipswich at the unused Borallan Correctional Center.

== Reception ==
On review aggregation website Rotten Tomatoes, the film won an approval rating of 17% based on 6 reviews, with an average rating of 3.5/10.

John Noonan, from Australian magazine FilmInk, called the film "a passionate but misguided cry that miscarriages of justice of this kind can happen."
