= Ferris & Sylvester =

British folk duo

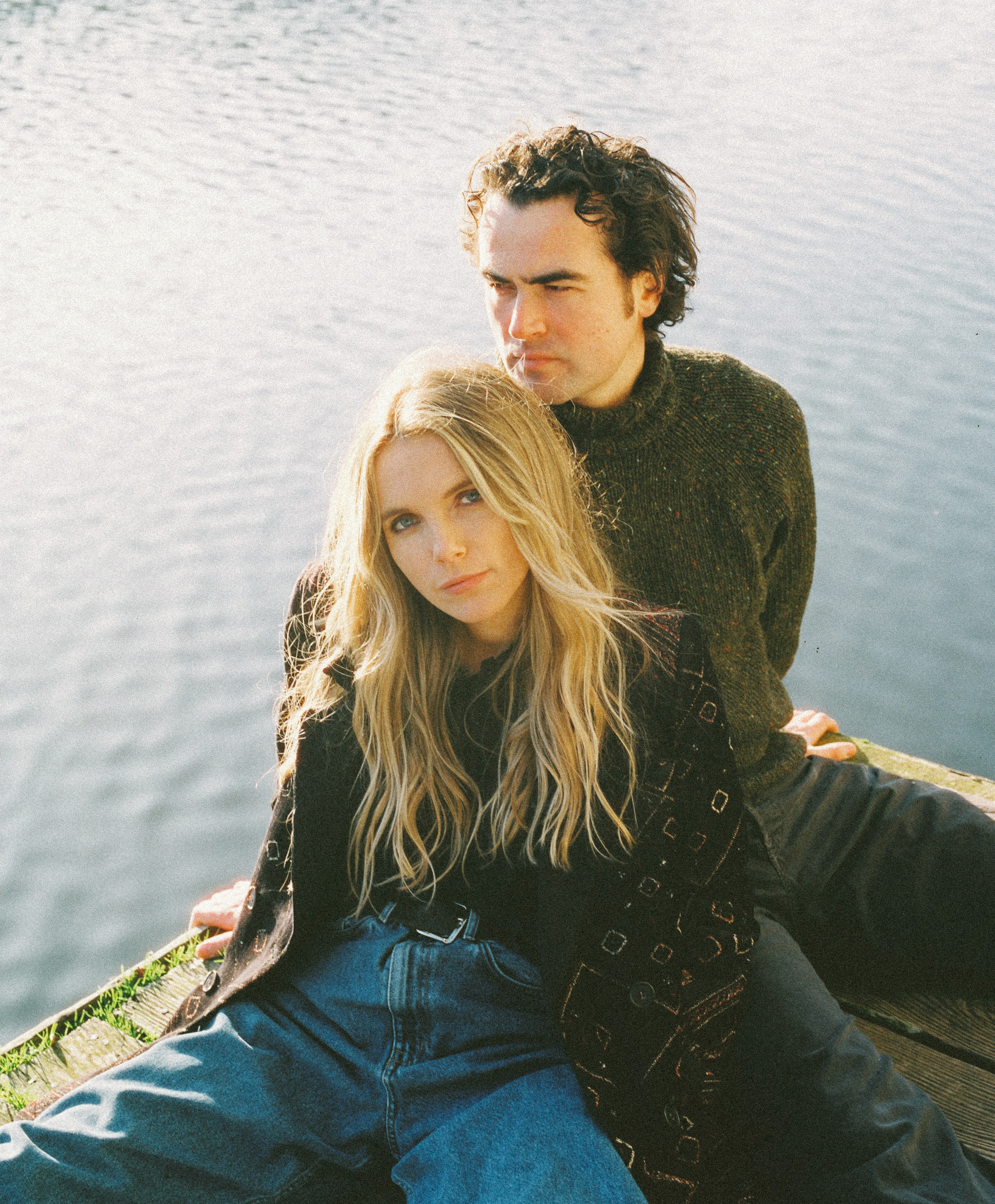
Ferris & Sylvester

Ferris & Sylvester are a British folk duo from London. The group consists of Issy Ferris and Archie Sylvester. In 2019, they were named as one of Rolling Stone's Americana artists to watch; their debut album, released in 2022, won "UK Album of the Year" at the 2023 UK Americana Awards.

== Career ==
The duo met in 2016 as solo musicians, working London's gigging circuit, and started writing together.

The duo released their debut EP, The Yellow Line, in 2017; it was produced by Youth at his Space Mountain Studios. Their second EP, Made in Streatham, was released in 2018, with the single "London's Blues" rising to number 14 on Spotify's UK Viral Chart. Their third EP, I Should Be on a Train, was released in 2020, followed by a live EP, Live at Real World Studios, in 2021.

In 2022, the duo released their debut album, Superhuman. The album debuted at No.1 in the UK's Official Jazz and Blues Album Chart and won UK Album of the Year at the 2023 Americana Awards.

Their second studio album, Otherness was released in March 2024. The 14-track album, released through their own label Archtop Records, was recorded at the duo's studio to a 1960s tape machine.
