= Kate Rorick =

American writer and producer

Kate Rorick is an American writer and producer known for her work in television and literature. She co-wrote The Secret Diary of Lizzie Bennet: A Novel (2014), a companion book to the Emmy-winning web series The Lizzie Bennet Diaries, where she also served as a consulting producer.

In television, Rorick has worked on several series, including Marvel’s Cloak & Dagger (2019), where she was a co-executive producer and writer. She later became co-showrunner for Leverage: Redemption (2021), contributing to new storylines in the revival of the crime caper series. In 2025, she was named showrunner for the television adaptation of The Plated Prisoner series, based on Raven Kennedy’s fantasy novels.

== Career ==
In 2014, Rorick co-wrote The Secret Diary of Lizzie Bennet: A Novel, a companion book to the Emmy-winning web series The Lizzie Bennet Diaries. As a consulting producer on the series, Rorick collaborated with creator Bernie Su to adapt the story into a journal-style format that provided additional character insight. The book, released on July 1, 2014, explored Lizzie’s personal thoughts, her relationship with her father, and untold moments from the series. It was part of a two-book deal, reflecting ongoing interest in The Lizzie Bennet Diaries and its extended storytelling.

In 2017, Rorick worked as a writer for TNT’s fantasy-adventure series The Librarians, which followed a secret society protecting the world’s mystical artifacts.

In 2019, Rorick served as a co-executive producer and writer for Marvel’s Cloak & Dagger Season 2, contributing to the show’s depiction of human trafficking. She discussed the importance of portraying the issue with realism and emotional depth on The Marvel After Show podcast. Rorick noted that the storyline resonated with her as a parent, highlighting concerns about child exploitation and the need for awareness. Alongside fellow writers and producers, she worked to ensure the narrative remained both engaging and informative.

In 2021, Rorick served as co-showrunner for Leverage: Redemption, the revival of the crime caper Leverage, which aired on IMDb TV (now Amazon Freevee). She contributed to the introduction of a new antagonist in the second half of Season 1—the international organization RIZ, depicted as a counterpart to the Leverage team. While the protagonists used their skills to help the powerless, RIZ was portrayed as selling its expertise to the highest bidder, becoming a recurring adversary. As co-showrunner, Rorick oversaw various creative storylines, including a Christmas-themed episode featuring guest star LeVar Burton, as well as episodes involving a corrupt golf hustler and a legendary grifter under an abusive conservatorship.

In 2025, Rorick was named showrunner for the television adaptation of The Plated Prisoner series, based on Raven Kennedy’s fantasy novels. The adaptation, developed by Mandalay Television, reimagines the tale of King Midas, centering on a young woman named Auren whose body has been turned to gold. Mandalay planned to take the project to market, citing the books’ popularity on social media platforms such as BookTok.
