= Tim Pocock =

Australian actor

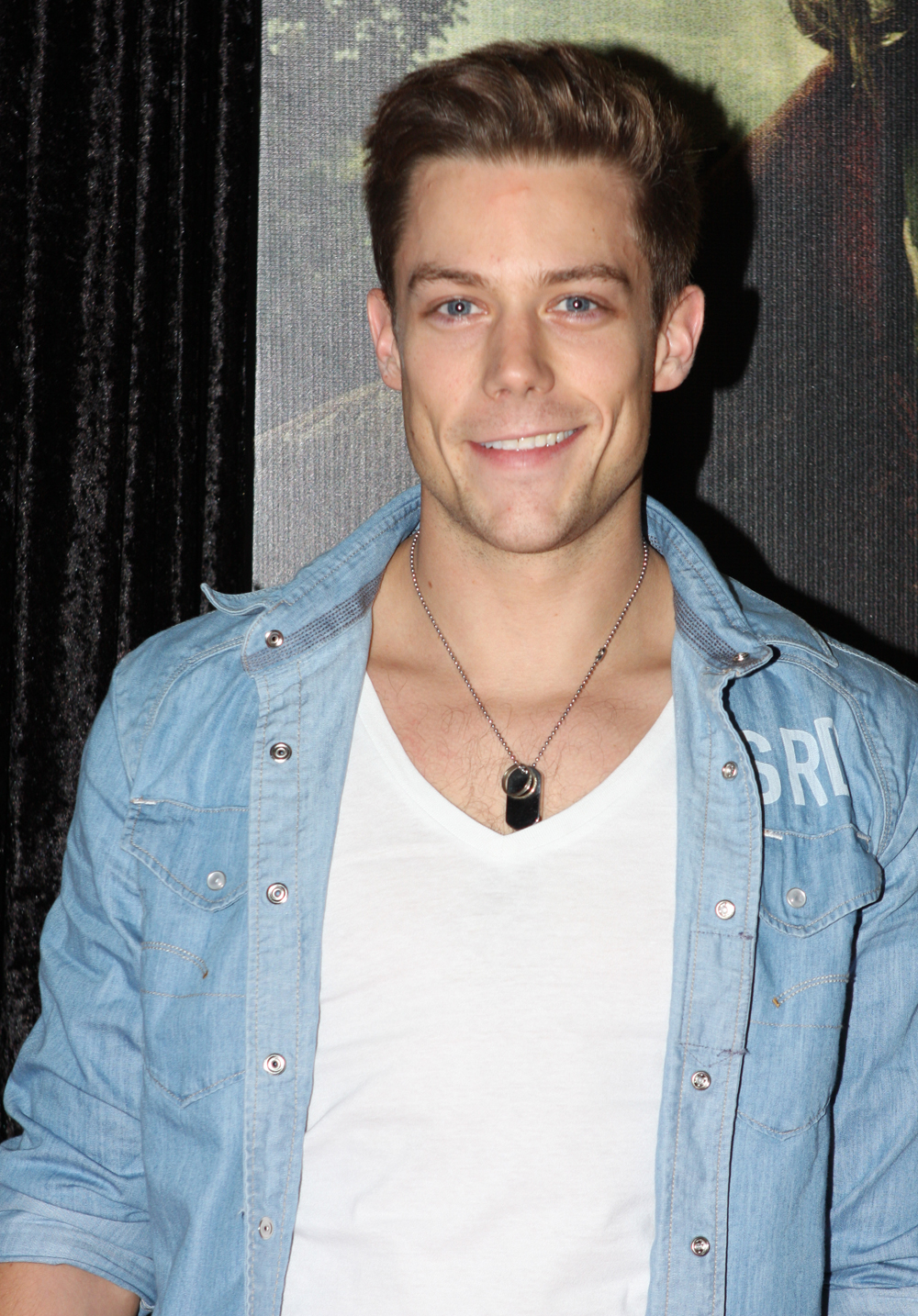
- Pocock in 2012
- Education: Redfield College, Dural
- Alma mater: National Institute of Dramatic Art
- Occupations: Actor; pianist
- Years active: 2009–present

Tim Pocock is an Australian actor and pianist best known for his role as a teenage Scott Summers in X-Men Origins: Wolverine, as well as Ethan Karamakov in the ABC television series Dance Academy and NBC's Camp, as Robbie Matthews.

== Life and career ==
Pocock attended Redfield College in Dural in Sydney, Australia. He began his interest in film in 2003, when in Year Twelve he submitted a short film for his Extension II English major work. Pocock started a career in acting despite not having studied drama.

He appeared on the Australian Soap Opera Home and Away in 2011, where he played Angus McCathie.

Pocock came out as gay during an interview on television series Four Corners, which was investigating harmful classroom practices in Australian Opus Dei schools, such as Redfield College.

His uncle is former New South Wales Minister for Finance Damien Tudehope.

== Filmography ==
=== Film ===
| Year | Film | Role | Notes |
|---|---|---|---|
| 2009 | X-Men Origins: Wolverine | Scott Summers / Cyclops | |
| 2013 | Forbidden Ground | Private Angus O'Leary | |
| 2014 | Lemon Tree Passage | Toby Stone | |
| 2016 | Red Billabong | Tristan Marshall | |
| 2023 | Godless: The Eastfield Exorcism | Daniel | |

=== Television ===
| Year | Title | Role | Notes |
|---|---|---|---|
| 2010 | Cops LAC | Lance | Episode "The Learning Curve" |
| 2010–2012 | Dance Academy | Ethan Karamakov | |
| 2011 | Home and Away | Angus McCathie | 3 episodes |
| 2013 | Camp | Robbie Matthews | |
| 2017 | The Lost Nirvana | William Blane | 4 episodes |
| 2017 | Runaways | Young Victor Stein | Episode: "Refraction" |
| 2018 | The First Month Is Free | Steve | Television film |
| 2022 | We Were Tomorrow | William | Post-production; 4 episodes |
