= Paul van Zyl =

Paul van Zyl grew up in South Africa during the apartheid era and served as the Executive Secretary of South Africa's post-apartheid Truth and Reconciliation Commission from 1995 to 1998.

== Education ==
He received a BA and LL.B. degree from the University of the Witwatersrand in Johannesburg in 1996 and an LL.M. in International Law from the University of Leiden in the Netherlands in 1997. Paul also earned an LL.M. in Corporate Law from the NYU School of Law. Paul was selected as a Hauser Global Scholar at NYU, a program which selects 10 of the finest students from countries across the world, chosen on the basis of their intellectual and leadership ability, as well as their capacity to participate productively in a global community of scholars and practitioners.

== Career ==
In 2001, Paul co-founded the International Center for Transitional Justice (ICTJ), an international human rights organisation based in New York City. The ICTJ works for justice in over 40 countries that have endured massive human rights abuses under repression and in conflict. They work with victims, civil society groups, national and international organisations to ensure redress for victims and to help prevent atrocities from happening again.

Paul received the Skoll Award for Social Entrepreneurship in 2009 with Juan E. Mendez, the former ICTJ President, for their contributions to transitional justice, and was chosen as a Young Global Leader by the World Economic Forum in 2008. Paul has served on the World Economic Forum's Global Agenda Council on Fragile States, and has been an adviser to the Sundance Documentary Film Program. For 15 years he served as the Director of New York University School of Law's Transitional Justice Program and for 5 years, he was a visiting professor of law at the National University of Singapore. Further, Paul was awarded an Honorary Doctorate of Laws by Santa Clara University School of Law in 2012. Paul has also served as an adviser and consultant to many NGOs and Governments on transitional justice issues in countries including: Colombia, Indonesia, East Timor, and Bosnia-Herzegovina.

Paul co-founded The Conduit in 2016 (opened summer 2018), a club to gather change makers, which now has branches in London and Oslo.

Paul was named by London Tech Week as one of its 30 "Change Makers 2018", celebrating the companies and people harnessing technology to inspire social and economic impact and drive global innovation.

== Lectures ==
- Introduction to Transitional Justice in the Lecture Series of the United Nations Audiovisual Library of International Law

== Articles ==
- Forbes, "How The Maiyet Collective Concept Store Will Reshape The Lexicon Of Ethical Luxe"
- The Financial Times, "The Conduit: a London members' club with a social purpose"
- The Evening Standard, "Can a members’ club change the world? That’s what The Conduit wants to do..."
- Vogue, "How New Members' Club The Conduit Plans To Change The World"
