= Forbidden Ground (2013 film) =

- Directed by: Johan Earl; Adrian Powers
- Written by: Johan Earl; Denai Gracie; Travis Spiteri
- Produced by: Johan Earl; Denai Gracie; Rakesh Sawant
- Starring: Johan Earl; Tim Pocock; Martin Copping
- Cinematography: Glenn Hanns
- Edited by: Adrian Powers
- Music by: Jason Fernandez
- Release dates: 16 August 2013 (United Kingdom); 11 December 2013 (Australia)
- Running time: 94 minutes
- Country: Australia
- Language: English
- Budget: $69 million

Forbidden Ground, also known as Battle Ground in the United States, is a 2013 Australian action drama film, starring Johan Earl, Tim Pocock, and Martin Copping, set against the backdrop of World War I. It was written by Earl, Denai Gracie, and Travis Spiteri, and directed by Earl and Adrian Powers.

== Plot ==
The film tells the story of three British soldiers during World War I, on the Western Front in 1916. During an abortive assault on the German trenches the three become trapped in no man's land as night falls. One of the soldiers is seriously wounded and requires urgent medical attention.

Another soldier knows that a massive artillery bombardment is due to begin soon and staying where they are would result in certain death. The three begin a retreat back to the Allied trenches pursued by the ever-watchful German soldiers who suspect that another attack is imminent.

During the journey, there are a number of flashbacks to England and the soldiers' private lives, which are discussed at various times. Also along the way, they encounter many obstacles.

== Cast ==
- Johan Earl as Sgt. Maj. Arthur Wilkins
- Tim Pocock as Pvt. O'Leary
- Martin Copping as Cpl Richard Jennings
- Denai Gracie as Grace Wilkins
- Sarah Mawbey as Eve Rose
- Barry Quin as Dr. Bennett
- Damian Sommerlad as Lieutenant
- Oliver Trajkovski as Lieutenant's Aide
- Igor Breakenback as Sgt. Schmidt (as Igor Smiljevic)
- Byron J. Brochmann as German Sniper
- Gudmund Helmsdal as German Soldier (voice) (as Gudmund Helmsdal Nielsen)
- Alex Jewson as Pvt. Riley
- Steve Maxwell as German Soldier
- James Shepherd as Pvt. Franklin
- Eli Gallagher as British Sniper

== See also ==
- List of Australian films
