= Editus =

- Origin: Costa Rica
- Genres: Latin; Jazz; New-age
- Members: Ricardo Ramírez; Edín Solís; Carlos Vargas
- Website: Editus

Editus is a Costa Rican music group. Their first album, Ilusiones was released in 1994. They went on to become a significant group in Costa Rica and have been praised by newspapers there as well as honored by ACAM Costa Rica. Outside Costa Rica they are perhaps best known for accompanying Rubén Blades, such as on his Grammy Award for Best World Music Album winning album Mundo.

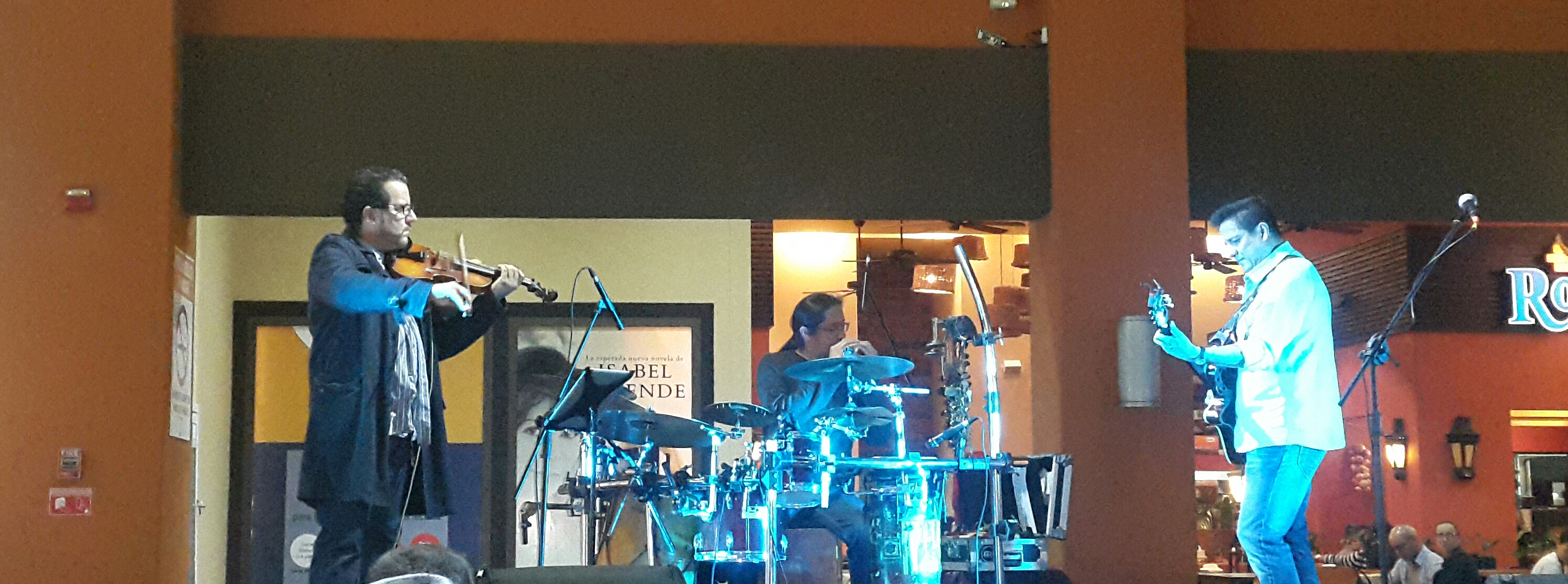
Editus
