= Cripping-up =

Casting a non-disabled actor in a disabled role

Cripping-up is a term used to describe the act of casting an actor without an apparent/visible disability into a role which is either scripted as having a disability, or into the role of an historical figure who is known to have been disabled.

The term is from the audience's perspective where the visibly apparent disability is mimicked by an actor who does not have physical, sensory or communication disability. This does not always include disabled actors being cast in roles with different conditions to their own as the practice of transposing a condition into a role can creatively work because the actor has a "lived experience" of disability.

The term "cripping-up" began to appear in mainstream media around 2010, and is a derivative of the word "crip". A campaign against the practice, seeking more authentic portrayal and representation in media, has become part of the disability rights movement. Figures in the TV and film industry, such as Jim Sheridan, have promoted authentic casting. Actors such as Bryan Cranston have defended their portrayals of visibly disabled characters.

== On screen ==
There were few disabled actors before the 1990s available to play authentic or incidental roles.

Historically, the majority of disabled roles went to non-disabled actors. With more disabled actors available, the number of instances of cripping-up has decreased, with a greater proportion of disabled characters being authentically cast.

- Ralph and Katie 2022 was a spin-off series from The A-Word by Tiger Aspect and the main roles are played by Sarah Gordy and Leon Harrop who are actors with Down syndrome.
- All The Light We Cannot See 2023, authentically cast Aria Mia Loberti as blind teenager Marie-Laure.
- The Fall of the House of Usher 2023 featured Ruth Codd who is an actor and amputee, as Juno.
- Bridgerton, Season 3 2024, introduced two new characters, Lady Stowell who is deaf is played by Sophie Wooley, and Lord Remington who uses a bath chair. Remington is played by Zak Ford-Williams, who is a wheelchair user.
- The Hardacres 2024 on cast Zak Ford-Williams as Harry Hardacre, the youngest son who has spastic diplegia.
- Shardlake 2024 by Disney cast Arthur Hughes, a physically disabled actor in the lead role. Hughes said in an interview about the series that Shardlake's disability was, "the least interesting thing about him."
- Echo 2023 to 2024 by Marvel, cast Alaqua Cox as the main role, who is also deaf.
- Wicked (The movie) 2024. After 20 years of stage productions where Nessarose was played by non-disabled actors, the film cast Marissa Bode and Cesily Collette Taylor (as a child) in the role, both of whom are wheelchair users.

The casting of Eddie Redmayne as Stephen Hawking in The Theory of Everything was described by The Guardian's Frances Ryan as "cripping-up" and likened to blackface.

== On stage ==
Disabled characters in stage plays have a history stretching as far back as the blind prophet Tiresias in Oedipus, by Sophocles.

King Richard III, who is implied as having kyphosis (scoliosis) in William Shakespeare's Richard III, was portrayed by disabled actor Mat Fraser in 2017. In 2022, the Royal Shakespeare Company announced that Arthur Hughes would be the first disabled actor in the theatre's history to play the role.

== Incidental portrayal ==
As of January 2026, the BBC's commissioning process includes investments of at least £80 million ($107M) in programmes based on diversity criteria. One criterion is diverse portrayal on-screen, which may include incidental on-screen portrayal of those with protected characteristics (including disability): a character just 'happens to be' from an under-represented characteristic. Similarly, Channel 4 (UK) created new guidance for portrayal, including incidental disabilities.

Unconscious biases towards disabled actors are seen as the biggest barriers to inclusion.
