= Matt Greenwood =

English actor (born 1995)

- Born: 27 February 1995 (age 31); Manchester, England
- Occupation: Actor
- Years active: 2010–present

Matt Greenwood (born 27 February 1995) is an English actor best known for portraying Tom Clarke in the BBC drama series The A Word and Martin Dunbar in one episode of Waterloo Road. He has also appeared in Casualty, Bohemian Rhapsody, and Giri/Haji.

== Life and career ==
Greenwood was born in Manchester, England on 27 February 1995. He began acting age 6, starting at the Helen O'Grady Children's Drama Academy, where he trained until the age of 10. It was then from ages 10 to 16 that he trained at the Carol Godby Theatre Workshop. During this time, he began working professionally as an actor, starting with the BBC's prime-time drama series Waterloo Road as transgender pupil Martin Dunbar. Greenwood then went on to train at the Manchester College – Shena Simon Campus, the National Youth Theatre of Great Britain, and the Manchester School of Acting, while continuing to act professionally alongside his studies.

His further credits include the role of Mark Davies in the BBC long-running medical drama series Casualty and series regular Tom Clarke in the BBC drama series The A Word. Greenwood can also be seen in the 20th Century Fox biopic Bohemian Rhapsody and in Giri/Haji, a 2019 TV series broadcast on BBC Two in the UK and streamed on Netflix worldwide. He has also worked extensively in theatre, both in his native Manchester and in London.

In 2019, Greenwood played the title character in the play Call Me Vicky for its debut run at The Pleasance Theatre, London in February and March as part of the theatre's #YouWillKnowTheirNames season, with veteran British actress Wendi Peters playing Vicky's mother, Sylvie. He received high praise from theatre critics for his performance and was nominated for the 2019 Best Male Performance category at the Offies.

In February 2022, it was announced that Greenwood would reprise his role from The A Word in a new spin-off series titled Ralph & Katie. Filming commenced in February in Manchester and the Lake District, the show's setting. The series aired on BBC One from 5 October 2022.

== Selected filmography ==
=== Film ===
List of film appearances, with year, title, and role shown
Year	Title	Role	Notes
2018	Bohemian Rhapsody	Young man in Clinic	

=== Television ===
List of television appearances, with year, title, and role shown
Year	Title	Role	Notes
2011	Waterloo Road	Martin Dunbar	Episode: series 7, episode 2
2013	Casualty	Mark Davies	Episode: "Broken Heart Syndrome"
2016–2020	The A Word	Tom Clarke	11 episodes
2019	Giri/Haji	Rodney's friend	Episode: "1.3"
2020	Sparks	Venus	Episode: "The Birth of Venus"
2022	Ralph & Katie	Tom Clarke	5 episodes
