= Kaite O'Reilly =

UK-based playwright, author and dramaturge

Kaite O'Reilly FRSL is UK-based playwright, author and dramaturge of Irish descent. She has won multiple awards for her work, including the Ted Hughes Award (2011) for her version of Aeschylus's tragedy The Persians. O'Reilly's plays have been performed at venues across the UK and at the Edinburgh Festival. Her work has also been shown internationally including in Europe Australia, Korea, Hong Kong and Taiwan. O'Reilly openly identifies as a disabled artist and has spoken of the importance of "identifying socially and politically as disabled" to her work. In 2023, she was elected a Fellow of the Royal Society of Literature.

== Personal life ==
O'Reilly was brought up in Birmingham, UK, by her parents who were Irish migrants. When she was growing up, her father was a butcher and market trader. She has described her working-class Irish heritage as "formative" in her career as a playwright. She currently lives in Llanarth, Wales. Kaite is sister of television presenter Miriam O'Reilly. Kaite has a visual impairment and a degenerative spinal condition. However, following the social model of disability she feels disabled by attitudes, not her impairments: "I am a woman with a sensory and physical impairment, but it is society's attitudinal and physical barriers which is disabling, not the idiosyncrasies of my body".

== Career ==
=== Early career (up to 2002) ===
O'Reilly's first job in theatre was as a performer for Graeae Theatre Company in 1986. In 1994, a piece of her writing appeared in Mustn't Grumble: An Anthology of Writing by Disabled Women (Women's Press). Her first major breakthrough came in 1998 for her play Yard produced for Bush Theatre, London. The play, which addresses themes of conflict, was drafted whilst O'Reilly was working as a relief aid worker in former Yugoslavia. It received critical acclaim, The Independent said the script had "scathing eloquence", and The DailyTelegraph said: "O'Reilly is clearly a writer with promise. She has an ear for lyrical dialogue, a strong sense of setting, and a vital humour." The play was the joint winner of the Peggy Ramsay Award. The following year, Yard was remounted with a German translation, entitled Schlachthaus, that played at Maxim Gorki Theater, Berlin, where it remained in repertoire for nearly two years. In 2000 O'Reilly's Belonging played at Birmingham Repertory Theatre, with The Guardian's Lyn Gardner describing it as "a little play but a really lovely one" and awarding it three stars.

=== Increasing mainstream exposure: from Peeling to The Almond and the Seahorse (2002–2008) ===
O'Reilly's 2002 play Peeling produced with Graeae Theatre Company would prove to be a watershed moment for O'Reilly with it winning plaudits for being "groundbreaking" (The Scotsman). It had two national production runs, and the play text was published by Faber and Faber. Whilst previous works had garnered a positive critical response Peeling was lavished with praise from several major press outlets. The Guardian drew comparisons to Samuel Beckett and called it "a major piece of theatre," awarding it 4 stars. Joyce Macmillan in The Scotsman labelled it a "minor feminist masterpiece" whilst The Herald called it "one of the most entertaining and provocative shows around this year". Benedict Nightingale in The Times awarded it 4 stars, calling it "a remarkably elaborate, imaginative and hard-hitting piece", while The Daily Telegraph described it as "a droll, self-deconstructing piece of theatre that is far too clever to be pigeonholed." Reviews praised the piece for its feminist sensibilities and disability politics, with its three characters played by disabled actresses, it highlighted how marginalised disabled people are by society at large. The play was adapted for radio and aired on Radio 3 in October 2003.

Following Peeling's first production in 2002, O'Reilly's Speaking Stones appeared at Theater ASOU in Austria. In April 2004 O'Reilly's play Perfect was shown at Contact Theatre. It won the Manchester Evening News Theatre Award (2004) for Best Play and Best Design. Later that year, Henhouse was produced with Arcola Theatre. Like Yard, it was influenced by O'Reilly's time in war-torn Yugoslavia, and covers the topic of civil war. In the same month, O'Reilly's radio-play Ambushed by Time, which follows the lives of two couples whose lives have been affected by damaged memory functions, aired on Radio 4's 'The Friday Play'. Between 2006 and 2007 O'Reilly had three more radio-plays aired on the BBC; Bora Bistrah (2007) and Walkie Talkies (2007) aired on Radio 3, whilst Rean's Girls (2006) aired on Radio 4.

O'Reilly's next major staged production came in 2008, in the form of The Almond and the Seahorse originally shown at Sherman Theatre before going on a national tour. The play explores the impact of major brain trauma, from a disability perspective. O'Reilly said she sought to challenge the "usual representations of people who survive brain injury as tragic or as victims". It was well received by the disability-specific press with Disability Arts Online calling it a "brilliant play" that "brings Disability Arts into the mainstream". Other press picked up on this too, Allison Vale in British Theatre Press observed: "O' Reilly passionately believes in the need to stage issues of disability in mainstream theatre. But this play goes far beyond simply providing a platform for the playwright's political agenda: this is a powerful drama, beautifully written, which says as much about the universal themes of life, love, death and devotion as it does about disability." Mainstream newspapers also raved about the production, with The Guardian giving it 5 stars and describing it as an "unmissable drama," while The Stage said: "The contrasts of mood and pace in the confrontations are beautifully handled, the sensitive ensemble work is quite superb."

=== Work on Unlimited Festivals and more international exposure (2008–present) ===
2010's Told by the Wind, which was a collaboration with Phillip Zarrilli and Jo Shapland, marked a decidedly experimental turn, where O'Reilly could flex her dramturgical muscles. The show has no dialogue and incorporates elements of dance and post-dramatic aesthetics of East Asia, giving the piece a "meditative" quality. In the same year National Theatre Wales commissioned O'Reilly's site-specific version of Aeschylus' war tragedy The Persians. The play was staged in a mock-up village on Ministry of Defence land in rural Wales, where troops train. As well as receiving glowing reviews (5 stars in The Daily Telegraph and 4 stars in The Guardian and The Times) it also earned O'Reilly the 2011 Ted Hughes Award for poetry.

In Water I'm Weightless was an Unlimited commission as part of the 2012 Cultural Olympiad and featured a cast of six deaf and disabled actors. The piece is experimental in form, with "no plot, narrative or characterisation to speak of" (The Guardian) incorporating access elements into the aesthetic such as sign language. Through "cut and paste" monologues, the play directly confronts stereotypes and barriers placed on disabled people, often inverting these; at one point a whole speech is delivered solely in British Sign Language so the majority of the audience won't be able to understand it. It was well received, getting 4 stars in The Guardian and The Arts Desk with the latter describing it as "almost worthy of Shakespeare".

2014 saw O'Reilly again working with long-time collaborator Phillip Zarrilli on a "performance text" dedicated to Frida Kahlo, The 9 Fridas which was translated into Mandarin and performed by Mobius Strip Theatre at the Taipei International Arts Festival, Taiwan. The show is currently being remounted and will be shown again later in 2016 in Hong Kong. In the same year O'Reilly wrote Woman of Flowers, a retelling of an ancient Welsh myth from the Mabinogion. Disability Arts Online said the script "sparkles with [O'Reilly's] trademark wit and use of evocative language," they also praised the use of integrated access including sign language and surtitles. The Stage were less effusive, awarding it 3 stars: "captivating as this often is, the mythic elements of the play don't always sit easy with the harder, nastier things at the core of this story."

Cosy was O'Reilly's second Unlimited commission which premiered at Wales Millennium Centre in March 2016. The play addresses issues of ageing and end-of-life scenarios, encompassing an integrated cast spanning 3 generations of women in a fictional family. Disability Arts Online concluded: "It's a play that you carry with you; its poignance and linguistic beauty and its clever, irreverent and oddly (considering the subject matter) life-affirming message." Cosy, along with four of O'Reilly's other performance texts, appeared in Atypical Plays for Atypical Actors, which was published later that year by Oberon Press.

== Political activism ==
Throughout both her life and career, O'Reilly has been an outspoken advocate of rights for disabled people. In 1987, O'Reilly lay down in front of a bus at a demo calling for equal access for disabled people to public transport. She told the British Council in a recent video interview "[in the 1980s] I was very involved in the disability civil rights movement, campaigning for equal access to public buildings, education and opportunities...I am incredibly disappointed at how little has changed." O'Reilly has also been vocally critical of the casting of non-disabled actors in disabled roles ('cripping up') and told Gender Forum (an internet-based academic journal) in 2005 that "cripping up is the twenty-first century's answer to blacking up". It is a position she has reasserted on numerous platforms, along with her 'policy' to "put crips in our scripts". As well as speaking out on disability-related issues O'Reilly has also called for greater representation of diversity in theatre and the media, in a 2016 interview, she told The Stage: "Theatre is the site where we gather collectively to explore what it is to be human. We have to have the breadth, depth and diversity of experience, rather than a monoculture or just a segment of society talking to itself."

== List of major works ==
=== Plays ===
- Cosy (2016. Unlimited commission, premiered at Wales Millennium Centre, directed by Phillip Zarrilli)
- Woman of Flowers (2014. A commission from Forest Forge. Drawn from the Mabinogion. World premiere and UK tour)
- The 9 Fridas (2014. A commission from Sherman Cymru. World premiere in Mandarin at the Taipei Festival directed by Phillip Zarrilli)
- In Water I'm Weightless (2012. To be produced by National Theatre Wales in July 2012, directed by John McGrath, part of the Cultural Olympiad to celebrate the 2012 London Olympics and Paralympics. Premiering 23 July at Wales Millennium Centre, Cardiff, and transferring to London's South Bank Centre as part of the official Olympic and Paralympic festival)
- Leaner Faster Stronger (A commission from Chol Theatre in a co-production with Sheffield Theatres. Directed by Andrew Loretto, as part of the Cultural Olympiad. May 2012. Sheffield Crucible Theatre, then touring in 2013)
- The Echo Chamber (The Llanarth Group. A performance text co-created with Ian Morgan, Phillip Zarrilli and Peader Kirk. Premiering at Chapter Arts Centre, Cardiff, in January 2012)
- Persians (2010 A new version of Aeschylus' PERSIANS for National Theatre Wales. A site-specific production on Ministry of Defence land in Brecon, directed by Mike Pearson)
- Told by the Wind (For The Llanarth Group. Dramaturg and writer in a co-creation with Jo Shapland and Phillip Zarrilli. Premiered at Chapter Arts Centre, Cardiff, then toured to TanzFabrik, Berlin; Exeter Phoenix and Grotowski Institute, Wroclaw, Poland)
- I Fall to Pieces (One woman show on survivors of the mental health system. Co-directed with Phillip Zarrilli. DaDaFest International Festival)
- A Library of Hands: The Evora Books (Dramaturg/tutor for site-specific performance project in Evora's historic library, with director Phillip Zarrilli. Escrita na Paisagem Performance Festival, Evora, Portugal)
- The 'D' monologues (2009. Rehearsed readings at National Theatre Studio; Cardiff Disability Pride; Unity Festival, Wales Millennium Centre)
- The Almond and the Seahorse (2008. Sherman Cymru Theatre Company. Directed by Phillip Zarrilli. Premiere in Cardiff, then national tour)
- In Praise of Fallen Women (2006. The Fingersmiths Ltd, Drill Hall. London. Writer and director of bilingual performance. English/BSL)
- Silent Rhythm (2004. Liverpool International Live Art Festival commission. Writer and director. Bluecoats/Tate gallery)
- Henhouse (Arcola Theatre London, by Glossalaila Theatre. Director Bill Hopkinson)
- Perfect (Contact Theatre Manchester. Director John McGrath)
- Peeling (2002/3. Graeae Theatre Company. Director Jenny Sealey. Two National and European tours. Chosen for British Council 'Best of British' showcase at Assembly Rooms, Edinburgh Fringe Festival 2003)
- Speaking Stones (2002. Theatre Asou, Austria. Director Phillip Zarrilli. A site-specific performance inside an underground quarry, Aflenz, and Theatre Im Palais, Graz, Austria)
- Belonging (2000. Birmingham Repertory Theatre. Director Anthony Clark)
- Slachthaus (1999. In repertoire for two years. The Maxim Gorki Theatre, Berlin)
- Yard (1998. The Bush Theatre London. Director Julie-Anne Robinson)

=== Radio dramas ===
- Walkie Talkies (2008. Radio monologue for Liverpool Freethinking Festival. Directed by Justine Potter for BBC Radio 3)
- Borah Bistra (2007. International Radio drama commission to commemorate 60th Anniversary of Partition. BBC Radio 3, transmitted 19 August. Directed by Shabina Aslam, diversity director of BBC radio drama)
- Rean's Girls (2006. Adapted from Foursight Theatre production for BBC Radio 4. Afternoon Play. Director: Kate Chapman)
- Ambushed By Time (2005. BBC Radio 4 Friday Night Theatre. Director Roland Jaquerrillo for Fiction Factory)
- Peeling (2003. BBC Radio 3 Sunday Night Theatre. Director David Hunter)
- Drought (2003. BBC Radio 4 afternoon play. Director David Hunter)
- Loves Out of Step (2001. BBC Radio 3 The Wire. Experimental radio drama. Director David Hunter)
- The Storyteller (1994. BBC Radio 4 The Afternoon Play. Director Clare Grove)

=== Publications ===
- The Women Writers Handbook (2020. Contributor. Aurora Metro Books.)
- Atypical Plays for Atypical Actors (2016. Oberon Books)
- Mother/Daughter Monologues Volume 1: Babes and Beginnings (2010. Edited by Emily Cicchini and Dr Gretchen Elizabeth Smith. Contributor. International Centre for Women Playwrights)
- Face On: Disability Arts in Ireland and Beyond (2007. Editor and contributor. Arts Disability Ireland/Create)
- The Almond and the Seahorse (2008. Sherman Cymru plays)
- Living Where the Nights Jive (2008. Parthian. Editor: Maggie Hampton)
- Henhouse (2004. Oberon Contemporary Plays)
- 'Cf11' Cardiff Central (2003. Gomer. Editor: Fran Rhydderch)
- Graeae: Plays Redefining Disability (2003. Edited by Jenny Sealey. Aurora Metro)
- Shelf Life (2002. An anthology of poetry and prose by those with a reduced life expectancy. Editor. National Disability Arts Forum, UK)
- Peeling (2002. Faber & Faber single play texts)
- Belonging (2000. Faber & Faber single play texts)
- Catwomen from Hell (2000. Honno Press)
- Mama's Baby (Papa's Maybe) (1999. Parthian. Editor: Richard Lewis)
- Yard (1998. Bush Theatre play scripts)
- Phoenix Irish Short Stories (1998. Phoenix. Editor: David Marcus)
- New Writing 3 (1994. British Council/Minerva. Editor: Andrew Motion)
- Mustn't Grumble (1994. The Women's Press. Editor: Lois Keith)

== Awards ==
- 2013: Nominated for the inaugural James Tait Black Memorial Prize (drama) for In Water I'm Weightless
- 2011: Winner of the Ted Hughes Award for New Works in Poetry, for Persians, a reworking of Aeschylus's classic. Awarded by the Poet Laureate Carol Ann Duffy and The Poetry Society
- 2009: Finalist in international Susan Smith Blackburn Prize for The Almond and the Seahorse
- 2004: Best New Play for Perfect, Manchester Evening News Theatre Awards.
- 2003: Best New Writing Award for Peeling, Theatre Wales Awards
- 1998: Peggy Ramsay Award for most innovative play of the year for Yard
- 1997: Image Magazine Irish Short Story Writers of the Year Awards
- 1996: Stand International Short Story Competition – runner-up with Mouth
- 1994: Mind/Allen Award – contributor to Mustn't Grumble, a prize-winning collection of short stories, published by The Women's Press
