= Leon Harrop =

British TV actor

- Born: 1991 or 1992 (age 33–34)
- Education: New Bridge School; Oldham College
- Occupation: Actor
- Years active: 2009–present
- Known for: The A Word; Ralph & Katie

Leon Harrop (born 1991 or 1992) is a British TV actor with Down's Syndrome, known for playing characters with the condition, most notably playing Ralph Wilson in The A Word (2016–2020), and its spin off series Ralph & Katie (2022).

== Career ==
Harrop is from the town of Royton in Greater Manchester, and his first TV acting role was in a 2009 episode of the BBC drama The Street set in an unnamed street in Manchester. He starred alongside his onscreen mother Maxine Peake and onscreen dad Stephan Graham. Harrop got the part after the casting company rang his school, New Bridge School, and Harrop's teacher suggested him. After Harrop's teacher asked his mother what she thought, she read the script to see if the role was a good fit for Harrop. Harrop says that reading the script made his mother cry. After filming the episode, the series' creator and writer Jimmy McGovern said Harrop was a "natural talent".

Harrop then went on to perform in another BBC drama set in Manchester, portraying Lee in the mini series From Here to There (2014) about the 1996 Manchester bombing by the IRA. He also appeared in a 2015 episode of the Channel 4 police procedural drama No Offence also set in Manchester, and a 2016 episode of the BBC anthology drama series, Moving On created by Jimmy McGovern, with whom Harrop had previously worked on The Street.

Harrop played series regular Ralph Wilson in The A Word between 2016 and 2020 in for all three series of the show, with the news and entertainment website HITC noting in September 2020 that his performance was being praised by fans of the show.

Between 2019 and 2021 Harrop had guest appearances in three episodes of the Sky One comedy drama Brassic. Also in 2021 he guest starred in the BBC medical drama Casualty as Jordan "Jordy" Holt in the 11th episode of the 35th series.

In 2022, Harrop reprised his role of Ralph Wilson in The A Word's spin off show Ralph and Katie starring alongside Sarah Gordy who plays the eponymous character of Katie Thorne.

== Filmography ==
TV Show	Role	Year	Episode(s)	Channel	Genre
The Street	Otto	2009	1 episode ("Past Life")	BBC One	Drama
From Here to There	Lee	2014	3 episodes	BBC One	Mini series
No Offence	Adam	2015	1 episode	Channel 4	Police procedural
Moving On	George	2016	1 episode ("Eighteen")	BBC One	Drama anthology
The A Word	Ralph Wilson	2016–2020	17 episodes	BBC One	Drama
Brassic	Albie	2019–2021	3 episodes	Sky One	Sitcom
Casualty	Jordan "Jordy" Holt	2021	1 episode	BBC One	Drama
Ralph & Katie	Ralph Wilson	2022	6 episodes	BBC One	Drama
Waterloo Road	Simon Crossman	2025	1 episode	BBC One	Drama
Emmerdale	Mick	2025	1 episode	ITV	Soap Opera

References: Harrop's agency: Conway Van Gelder Grant, and IMDb
