= Nina Bulsara =

Fictional character from Doctors

- Doctors character
- Wendi Peters as Nina Bulsara
- Portrayed by: Wendi Peters; Bibi Jay (2023 flashback)
- Duration: 2023–2024
- First appearance: "Hell is Empty"; 20 February 2023
- Last appearance: "Dead Woman Talking"; 18 April 2024
- Created by: Peter Eryl Lloyd
- Introduced by: Mike Hobson
In-universe information
- Occupation: Board member General practitioner Surgery partner
- Husband: Rahul Bulsara
- Sons: Suni Bulsara

Dr. Nina Bulsara is a fictional character from the BBC soap opera Doctors, portrayed by Wendi Peters. Details surrounding her casting and Nina's characterisation were announced in November 2022 on Morning Live, when she had just begun filming for the soap. Peters, who rose to prominence for playing Cilla Battersby-Brown in Coronation Street, was grateful to be offered a role that was completely different to Cilla. Nina's introductory scenes were delayed to air since they involved her and Zara Carmichael (Elisabeth Dermot Walsh) getting caught up in an explosion and were set to air at a similar time to the 2023 Turkey–Syria earthquake, which the BBC felt would be insensitive. The scenes eventually aired and acted as a catalyst for Zara to introduce Nina as a partner and doctor at the fictional Mill Health Centre.

Shortly after Nina's introduction, her family life was explored with the introduction of her son, Suni Bulsara (Rahul Arya). She is shown to be an overbearing mother to him who tries to "micromanages every aspect of his life". Her storylines with Suni include getting him a job at the Mill without consulting him, learning that he is bisexual and giving Suni her share of the partnership, again without consulting him. Nina's other storylines included taking on the head of the gynaecological department about the pain women in their department face, who is revealed to be her ex-fiancé. Despite an initial good response to the character, Nina was not well-received by viewers on Doctors, with many opining that she did not fit into the series.

== Development ==
=== Casting and characterisation ===
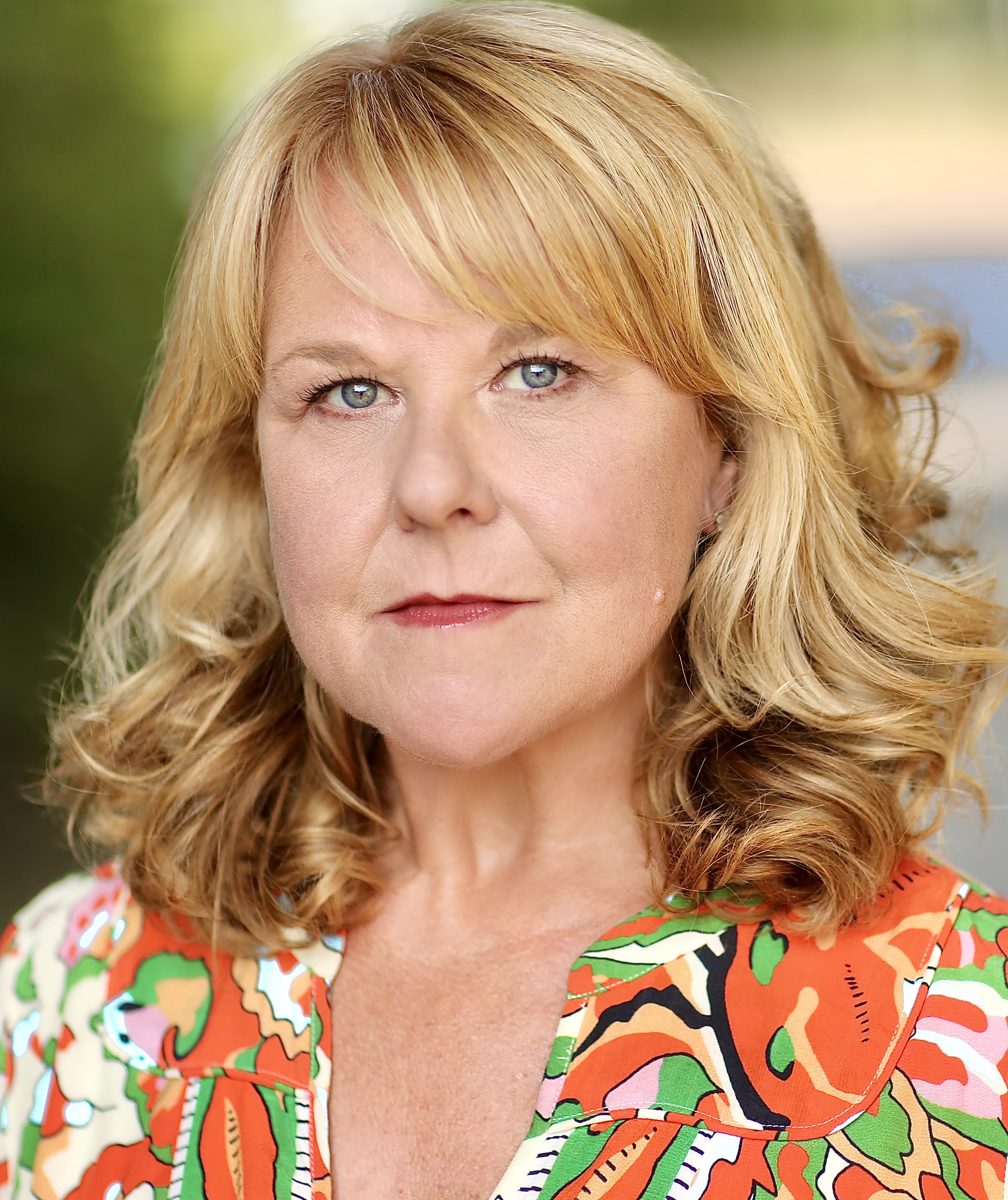
Peters was glad to play a different type of character to her former Coronation Street role, Cilla Battersby-Brown.

Wendi Peters began filming for Doctors in October 2022 and announced her casting on the BBC topical series Morning Live on 2 November 2022. Prior to being cast as Nina, Peters portrayed Nicky Connelly in a 2021 episode of Doctors. Doctors had a rule where guest stars typically cannot return until a minimum of three years had passed, meaning her casting as Nina was a rare example. To promote her casting on Doctors, Peters appeared on the radio show Here She Is. The radio show host asked her if there was any connection between the two roles, to which she clarified that Nina is a new and unconnected character.

On Peters' casting, executive producer Mike Hobson said: "We are absolutely delighted to welcome Wendi to the Doctors cast. She is a familiar face every soap fan will recognise and we know she will be brilliant in this role." Peters' first episode as Nina was set to air on 8 February 2023 where the character meets with Zara Carmichael (Elisabeth Dermot Walsh) at a medical conference. In the episode, the characters get caught up in an explosion at the hotel hosting the conference. However, due to the episode being set for transmission at a similar time to the 2023 Turkey–Syria earthquake, the BBC decided to pull the episode from television schedules hours before transmission. The episode eventually aired on 20 February 2023. The trauma of the explosion acts as bonding for Nina and Zara and the two become set on introducing Nina as a partner at the Mill Health Centre.

Peters, who rose to prominence for portraying Cilla Battersby-Brown on Coronation Street, said that Nina is a completely different type of character to Cilla. Peters was elated to receive a character brief that was so different to her, since she felt that many soap viewers only saw her as Cilla. One difference that she noted was that producers requested a heightened-RP accent; she appreciated this since she used an accent for Cilla and many viewers believed that she spoke like that. Nina's backstory involves growing up as the daughter of two solicitors. Nina then went on to marry a consultant who later died from a stroke. Peters described Nina as a headstrong woman who "knows what she wants" and hoped to see Nina get it. Hobson billed Nina as "a feisty busybody who wants to be respected" and hinted that she will "ruffle a few feathers at the Mill."

=== Exploration of family life ===
On Here She Is, Peters confirmed that Nina's surname is derived from her dead husband, who was Indian. She also revealed that the pair have a son together who would be arriving in the serial a few weeks after Nina's debut. Once Zara persuades fellow partner Daniel Granger (Matthew Chambers) to allow Nina to become a partner, she states that she wants her son, Dr. Suni Bulsara (Rahul Arya), to be hired at the Mill. Nina's BBC profile described her as a "headstrong woman who knows what she wants", while Suni's noted his close relationship with Nina and called him a "mummy's boy".

Nina is "adamant" about Suni being hired. She is successful in getting him a job position, but the Metro's Chris Hallam noted how Suni makes a bad first impression on almost everybody at the Mill. A few weeks into his tenure, Suni was the focus of a standalone episode that flashed back to see his angry reaction to Nina getting him a job at the Mill without consulting him prior. Another exploration of Nina's dynamic with Suni that is explored is him concealing his bisexuality from her, which he later reveals. Despite an initially frosty reception from Nina, she later supports him.

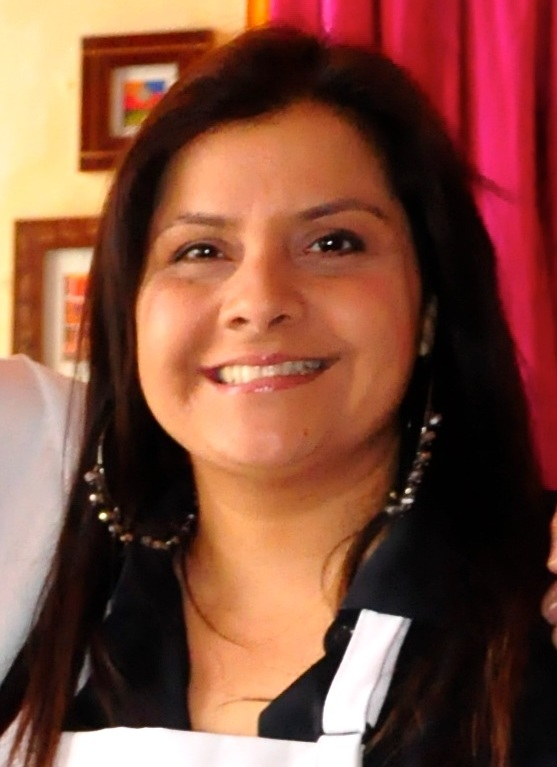
Nina Wadia portrayed Nina's overbearing sister-in-law, Binita Prabhu.

Binita Prabhu (Nina Wadia) was introduced as Nina's sister-in-law and "a dreadfully overbearing relative" who is "hard to please". When Nina learns that she plans on visiting them, she clears the house of all microwave meals, as well as hiring a cleaner to avoid criticism from Binita. Suni assumes that Nina is overreacting, but Nina is "soon vindicated". Upon Binita's arrival, she uses Nina "like a human coat hanger" and makes comments about how she is not feeding Suni enough. Binita then offends Nina by billing her work at the Mill Health Centre a hobby. It was hinted that both Nina and Suni would not be able to put up with more of Binita's behaviour over time. Her guest stint climaxed with a showdown between the three of them when Nina and Suni tire of Binita's judgements.

=== Feud with ex-fiancé and departure ===
January 2024 saw Nina at the centre of a topical storyline that explored the pain women experience as part of gynaecological care in hospitals. She has an unpleasant experience within the gynaecological department at St. Phils Hospital, after which she arranges a meeting with the head of department to spark an investigation. The storyline accommodated the arrival of Ed Jordan (David Bark-Jones), the head of department, who was revealed to be Nina's ex-fiancé.

Nina "gets a blast-from-the-past" as she is unaware that Ed runs it. Ed shuts down Nina's claims of women's painful experiences and tries to say she is causing trouble due to him walking out on her without an explanation years prior, which infuriates Nina. Ed invites Nina to dinner, which makes her hold off on sending a formal complaint. He tries to kiss her after dinner, to which she walks off. He soon arrives at the Mill when she is seeing patients, trying to talk to her, which she also dismisses.

In September 2023, ten months after joining Doctors, it was announced that Peters had left her role as Nina. In the series, Nina reveals to Zara that she wants to leave her role as partner at the Mill, as well as pass her share of the partnership onto Suni. The decision comes after Nina delivers a lecture to medical students about the pain caused by certain gynaecological doctors and she is offered a full-time lecturing role. After Suni "has finally had enough of his controlling mum", he declines the partnership and moves out of the family home. However, Suni comes around and accepts Nina's offer.

== Reception ==
Helen Daly of the Radio Times described Nina as "a chatterbox who has an opinion on everything and everyone" and opined that while she can be overbearing for her fellow colleagues, she is "a ray of light and will always find the positive in any difficult situation". Daly wrote that Nina would be a good addition to the series, as well as Metro's Calli Kitson being intrigued by the character. Peters' co-star Elisabeth Dermot Walsh posted online that she was excited for viewers to meet the "charming, dynamic and maddening character". Also writing for the Metro, Chris Hallam described Nina as "bossy, interfering and annoying". What to Watch wrote that Nina was a bossy character who "micromanaged every aspect of Suni's life".

Following media reports of Peters' having filmed her final scenes on Doctors, people were "surprised" she had left the soap so soon. Viewers questioned if the decision had been made by Peters or the producers since there was a fan consensus that the character was disliked by viewers. Fans of Doctors suspected that her contract had not been renewed and felt that bringing the character in was a "pointless" decision due to her short tenure. One viewer stated: "Wendi is a great, versatile actress. And yet she really just didn't fit in this role. The fake accent was pretty poor", with numerous others agreeing with them. However, some viewers were disappointed to see her leave the series, feeling that she had potential to become a long-serving character.
