= Pooky Quesnel =

English actress, screenwriter and singer

- Born: Joanna Gabrielle Quesnel; Eccles, Lancashire, England
- Occupations: Actress, screenwriter, singer
- Years active: 1980s–present

Joanna Gabrielle "Pooky" Quesnel is an English actress, screenwriter and singer.

== Early life ==
Quesnel was born and raised in Eccles, Lancashire, along with her five siblings. Her father was born in Trinidad. She read English at Oxford University before spending a year at the Academy of Live and Recorded Arts. In the 1980s she performed in Humphrey Carpenter's Vile Bodies band at the Ritz Hotel, and performed in a tribute concert to him following his death in 2005. In 2003 she began screenwriting, producing scripts for Doctors and Family Affairs, appearing in the latter as Diane Short.

== Career ==
Quesnel has played Dr. Monica Broome in the first series of Cardiac Arrest and DC Grace Harris in the first two series of Thief Takers. She had a recurring role in the third series of Cold Feet as Emma Keaton and returned to medical dramas in 2006, playing Dr. Christine Whelan in The Golden Hour. In 2007, she starred as Nita in the BBC One series True Dare Kiss, and later that year began a recurring role in EastEnders as Rachel Branning, taking over the character from Sukie Smith. In February 2008, she played the spoken title role in a City of Birmingham Symphony Orchestra production of Stravinsky's Perséphone, broadcast on BBC Radio 3. In July 2008, she appeared in an episode of the ITV murder mystery series, Midsomer Murders as journalist Julie Benson, and in an episode of George Gently entitled "The Burning Man", playing the character Wanda Lane. In March 2010, she appeared as Maureen in BBC One's second series of Five Days. She also played the spaceship captain in the Doctor Who 2010 Christmas special, "A Christmas Carol". In November 2010, she appeared as Christopher Eccleston's character's wife in Jimmy McGovern's Accused.

From 2014 to 2015, she played the role of Olga Fitzgerald, Geography teacher and Headteacher Vaughan Fitzgerald's estranged wife in BBC's Waterloo Road. The following year she played Dorothea Ames, Head teacher at Coal Hill Academy, in the BBC3 series Class, and provided the voice of Yuria of Londor in the video game Dark Souls III. She played Louise Wilson in BBC's The A Word, and reprised the role more prominently in its spin-off series Ralph & Katie.

== Personal life ==
Quesnel practises kickboxing, tai chi, and flamenco dancing. In 2017, Quesnel won bronze at the British Council for Chinese Martial Arts (BCCMA) annual British Tai Chi Championships in the Open Weapon category for her Wudang taijijian routine.

== Filmography ==
=== Film and television ===
Year	Title	Role	Other notes
1993	The Hawk	WPC Clarke	Feature film
1993	A Woman's Guide to Adultery	Francie	2 episodes
1994	Cardiac Arrest	Dr. Monica Broome	6 episodes
1994	Finney	Carol	All 6 episodes
1994	The Bill	Elaine Curtis	Episode: "Licensed to Kill"
1996	Thief Takers	DC Grace Harris	Main role; 16 episodes
1998	The Ambassador	Liz	Episode: "Nine Tenths of the Law"
1999	A Christmas Carol	Maude	Television film
2000	The Mrs Bradley Mysteries	Delilah Hicks	Episode: "The Worsted Viper"
2000	Sunburn	Josie Daley	Series 2: Episode 7
2000	City Central	Zora	Episode: "Respect"
2000	Innocents	Michaela Willis	Television film
2000	Cold Feet	Emma Keaton	Series 3: Episodes 4, 6, 7 and 8
2001	Adrian Mole: The Cappuccino Years	Eleanor Flood	Series 1: Episodes 5 and 6
2001	The Inspector Lynley Mysteries	Stepha Odell	Episode: "A Great Deliverance"
2001	Doctors	Angela Crowther	Episode: "Bring Me Sunshine"
2001	The Armando Iannucci Shows	Unknown	Episode: "Imagination"
2001–2002	Family Affairs	Diane Short	Regular role Nominated, British Soap Award for Best Actress, 2002
2003	Holby City	Melanie Knox	Episode: "House of Cards"
2003	The Bill	Jo Fox	Series 19: Episode 99
2004	Monarch of the Glen	Kelly McGee	Series 6: Episode 6
2005	Doctors	Rebecca Dobson	Episode: "When Two Become One"
2005	Life Isn't All Ha Ha Hee Hee	Bea	Miniseries; 2 episodes
2005	The Golden Hour	Dr. Christine Whelan	Miniseries; all 4 episodes
2005	Walk Away and I Stumble	Suzi	Television film
2006	Holby City	Jill Pearce	Episode: "Invasion"
2007	Skins	Claire	Episode: "Jal"
2007	Recovery	Homeowner	Television film
2007	Oh Happy Day	Fern	Feature film
2007	True Dare Kiss	Nita McKinnon	All 6 episodes
2007	Suburban Shootout	Penny Hawthorne	Episodes: "Fight Club" and "In it For the Wild Life"
2007–2010	EastEnders	Rachel Branning	Recurring role; 18 episodes
2008	Midsomer Murders	Julia Benson	Episode: "Midsomer Life"
2008	Inspector George Gently	Wanda Lane	Episode: "The Burning Man"
2008	Casualty	Pennie Ashton	Episode: "Guilt Complex"
2009	Ashes to Ashes	Ruth Irvine	Series 2: Episode 1
2009	The Bill	Maria Walmsley	Episode: "Down South"
2009	Criminal Justice	Amelia Rose	5 episodes
2009	The Clinic	Sue Murdoch	Series 7: Episode 3
2009	Enid	Theresa Blyton	Television film
2009	Paradox	D.C.I. Sarah Bower	Miniseries; 3 episodes
2010	Five Days	Maureen Hardy	4 episodes
2010	Doctors	Dr. Diana Flaxman	3 episodes
2010	New Tricks	Lady Catherine Bryant	Episode: "Good Morning Lemmings"
2010	Moving On	Lynne	Episode: "Sauce for the Goose"
2010	Accused	Carmel Houlihan	Episode: "Willy's Story"
2010	Law & Order: UK	Andrea Raines	Episode: "Shaken"
2010	Doctor Who	The Captain	Episode: "A Christmas Carol"
2011	Shameless	Sandra Brown	Episode: "Kidnap and Ransom"
2011	Scott & Bailey	Siân Cook	Episode: "Personal"
2011	Ideal	Donna	Episode: "The Love"
2011	In with the Flynns	Rachel	Episode: "Whistleblowing"
2011	Casualty	Emma Davies	Episode: "Starting Out"
2011	The Body Farm	Sarah Haines	Episode: "You've Got Visitors"
2011	Top Boy	Dr. Jenny Northam	3 episodes
2011	Just Henry	Mrs Jeffries	Television film
2012	The Preston Passion	Betty Cleasby	Television film
2012	Silent Witness	Helen Karamides	Episodes: "Paradise Lost": Parts 1 & 2"
2012	Starlings	Lynn	Series 1: Episode 7
2012	Great Expectations	Sarah Pocket	Feature film
2013	Not Going Out	Pregnant Woman	Episode: "Skiing"
2013	The Guilty	Ruth Hyde	Miniseries; all 3 episodes
2013	Truckers	Pauline	Series 1: Episode 5
2014	Doctors	Wanda Aleksandrov	Episode: "Made in Heaven"
2014	Endeavour	Muriel Todd	Episode: "Trove"
2014–2015	Waterloo Road	Olga Fitzgerald	Series 10; 12 episodes
2016	Father Brown	Ruth Moore	Episode: "The Resurrectionists"
2016	Pride and Prejudice and Zombies	Mrs. Phillips	Feature film
2016–2020	The A Word	Louise Wilson	All 18 episodes
2016	The Living and the Dead	Agnes Thatcher	3 episodes
2016	Class	Headmistress Dorothea Ames	Recurring role; 4 episodes
2017	Tommies	Vera Bliss (voice)	Episode: "17th April 1917"
2017	W1A	Fiona Craig	Recurring role; 3 episodes
2017	The Wright Stuff	Guest panelist	1 episode
2018	Kiss Me First	Marion	Miniseries; 2 episodes
2018	The Queen and I	Delia Manson	Television film
2019	The Victim	Mo Buckley	Miniseries; all 4 episodes
2019	Ransom	Olga	Episode: "Prima"
2020	Two Weeks to Live	Mandy	3 episodes
2021	Ladhood	Maria Pearce	Episode: "Mary"
2021	Wolfe	Maxine	3 episodes
2021	Riding Liberty	Sue	Short film
2021	The Trick	Stella Acton	Television film
2022	The Chelsea Detective	Julia Romano	Episode: "Mrs. Romano"
2022	Ralph & Katie	Louise Wilson	All 6 episodes
2022	The Confessions of Frannie Langton	Linux	
2023	Beyond Paradise	Louise Fitzallan	Series 1: Episode 3
2024	Moonflower Murders	Pauline Treherne / Maureen Gardner	All 6 episodes
2026	Tip Toe	Marie Goss	All 5 episodes

=== Stage ===
Year	Production	Role	Theatre
1991	Sweet Sessions	The Dark Lady	Old Fire Station, Oxford
1993	Don't Fool with Love	Peasant Girl	National tour
1993	A Month in the Country	Verochka	Salisbury Playhouse
1993	Billy Liar	Rita	Salisbury Playhouse
1995	Racine's Andromache, adapted by Craig Raine	Annette LeSkye	Almeida Theatre
1997	Jane Eyre	Bertha	Shared Experience theatre company at the Wolsey Theatre, Ipswich, Young Vic Theatre, London, and touring
1998	Anna Karenina	Kitty and Seriozha	Brooklyn Academy of Music's Majestic Theater, Lyric Hammersmith
2003	Present Laughter	Monica	Yvonne Arnaud Theatre, Guildford, King's Theatre, Glasgow
2004	Loot	Fay	Bristol Old Vic
2005	Romeo and Juliet	Lady Capulet	Royal Exchange Theatre
2005	Sitting Pretty	Unknown	New Wolsey Theatre, Ipswich
2008	Perséphone	Persephone	City of Birmingham Symphony Orchestra

=== Video games ===
Year	Title	Role	Other notes
2015	Bloodborne	Arianna Lady of the Night, Yharnamite, Female Protagonist Voice	
2016	Dark Souls III	Yuria of Londor, Birch Woman(Ashes of Ariandel DLC)	
2020	Watch Dogs: Legion	Mary Kelley	
