= Houdini & Doyle =

British-Canadian-American television drama series

- Genre: Drama; Action; Mystery; Crime; Adventure; Period
- Created by: David Hoselton; David Titcher
- Starring: Stephen Mangan; Michael Weston; Rebecca Liddiard; Adam Nagaitis; Tim McInnerny; Emily Carey
- Composer: James Jandrisch
- Countries of origin: United Kingdom; Canada; United States
- Original language: English
- No. of seasons: 1
- No. of episodes: 10

Production
- Executive producers: Stephen Hopkins; Kate Garwood; Christina Jennings; Scott Garvie; Maggie Murphy; Kenton Allen; Luke Alkin; Matthew Justice; David Titcher; David Hoselton; David Shore
- Producer: Adrian Sturges
- Production locations: The Space Project, Manchester, England
- Cinematography: Philipp Blaubach; Stephen Reizes
- Editors: John Smith; D. Gillian Truster; Paul G. Day; Stephen Philipson
- Camera setup: Single-camera
- Running time: 60 minutes
- Production companies: Shore Z Productions; Shaw Communications; Big Talk Productions; Shaftesbury Films; Sony Pictures Television

Original release
- Network: Fox (U.S.); ITV (UK); Global (Canada)
- Release: 13 March – 4 July 2016

Houdini & Doyle is a television drama series loosely based on the real-world friendship of Harry Houdini and Sir Arthur Conan Doyle. A 10-episode first season was ordered by Fox in the United States, ITV in the United Kingdom, and Global in Canada. The pilot episode was written by co-creators David Hoselton and David Titcher. The first episode was broadcast simultaneously on ITV and ITV Encore on Sunday 13 March 2016.

On 3 August 2016, Fox cancelled the series after one season.

== Premise ==
Harry Houdini is a cynical skeptic and atheist whereas Dr. Arthur Conan Doyle is a believer in the paranormal and supernatural. The drama opens in 1901 London, shortly after the publication of Doyle's The Great Boer War. Houdini and Doyle become involved in the investigation of several mysterious deaths. They debate whether the causes are natural or supernatural, and often bet on the cause, which causes their police liaison, Constable Adelaide Stratton, some embarrassment.

== Cast ==
=== Main ===
- Michael Weston as Harry Houdini
- Stephen Mangan as Arthur Conan Doyle
- Rebecca Liddiard as Adelaide Stratton
- Adam Nagaitis as George Gudgett
- Tim McInnerny as Horace Merring

=== Recurring ===
- Emily Carey as Mary Conan Doyle
- Noah Jupe as Kingsley Conan Doyle
- Diana Quick as Cecelia Weiss

=== Guest ===
- Louise Delamere as Touie Doyle
- Laura Fraser as Lydia Belworth
- Nathan Stewart-Jarrett as Elias Downey
- Blake Harrison as Lyman Biggs
- Edward Akrout as Henry
- Janine Duvitski as Martha
- James Fleet as Dr. Pilsen
- Ewen Bremner and Mark Caven as Sherlock Holmes
- Owen Teale as Professor Havensling
- Peter Outerbridge as Thomas Edison
- Paul Ritter as Bram Stoker
- Brandon Oakes as Walt
- Emily Hampshire as Madame Korzha

== Production ==
The series was a treaty co-production between Big Talk Productions in the UK, and Shaftesbury Films in Canada, in association with Sony Pictures Television in the US, where executive producer David Shore's Shore Z Productions is based. It was filmed in two stages at The Space Project in Manchester with Liverpool Town Hall and Water Street being used for some of the exterior filming.

== Broadcast ==
The series premiered on ITV and ITV Encore in the United Kingdom on 13 March 2016. It premiered on 2 May 2016, on Global in Canada and Fox in the United States. The series aired on RTÉ in the Republic of Ireland and Northern Ireland on 18 May 2016 The series aired on Tokyo MX in Tokyo, Japan on 9 July 2019

== Episodes ==
No.	Title	Directed by	Written by	Original air date (UK)	Canada & U.S. air date	US viewers (millions)
1	"The Maggie's Redress"	Stephen Hopkins	Story by : David Hoselton & David Titcher; Teleplay by : David Hoselton	13 March 2016	2 May 2016	2.62
Adelaide Stratton, Scotland Yard's first female constable, investigates the death of a murdered nun at a convent. Houdini and Doyle join the case as consultants when a witness claims the nun was murdered by the ghost of a young unwed mother who died at the convent six months ago.
2	"A Dish of Adharma"	Stephen Hopkins	David Hoselton	17 March 2016	9 May 2016	2.36
A 12-year-old boy shoots well-known suffragette Lydia Belworth (Laura Fraser), but not fatally. Houdini and Doyle get involved when the boy claims he is the reincarnation of a man whom he says Belworth murdered.
3	"In Manus Dei"	Daniel O'Hara	Melissa R. Byer & Treena Hancock	24 March 2016	16 May 2016	2.42
Houdini, Doyle and Adelaide investigate a faith healer when a heckler drops dead at one of the healer's public sessions. The healer appears to have the power he claims when he pays a visit to Doyle's wife who soon awakes from her coma, while doubter Houdini is overcome with boils and a debilitating illness.
4	"Spring-Heel'd Jack"	Daniel O'Hara	Carl Binder	31 March 2016	23 May 2016	2.62
The death of a motorcar entrepreneur is initially attributed to a mysterious dark demon, the legend of which goes back several decades. When a second murder is attributed to the same demon, Houdini and Doyle try to determine if the legend may be true.
5	"The Curse of Korzha"	Ed Bazalgette	Joshua Brandon	7 April 2016	30 May 2016	2.02
Madame Korzha (Emily Hampshire), a travelling medium, uses her powers to help the local police find a missing girl. While Doyle believes some people have psychic powers, Houdini remains skeptical, especially when Korzha is unable to locate another missing girl. Doyle is also taken aback when Korzha predicts Adelaide's demise.
6	"The Monsters of Nethermoor"	Ed Bazalgette	Nazrin Choudhury	14 April 2016	6 June 2016	2.50
When a young man wakes up naked in a burned out circle claiming that his wife was kidnapped by aliens, Houdini becomes the believer and Doyle the skeptic.
7	"Bedlam"	Robert Lieberman	David Titcher	21 April 2016	13 June 2016	1.66
When people start to seemingly become scared to death, the gang sets out to find the source and are led to Bethlem Hospital, where Doyle has a mysterious connection.
8	"Strigoi"	Robert Lieberman	Carl Binder	28 April 2016	20 June 2016	1.79
When the housemaid of Doyle's old friend Bram Stoker is murdered with a stake through the heart, suspicions arise that Stoker may either be the killer...or a vampire.
9	"Necromanteion"	Jeff Renfroe	Melissa R. Byer and Treena Hancock	5 May 2016	27 June 2016	1.75
While Houdini visits New York to bury his mother, Doyle and Adelaide investigate a murderous poltergeist in Canada, encountering Thomas Edison (played by Peter Outerbridge) with his newest invention, the Necrophone, a device for communicating with the dead.
10	"The Pall of LaPier"	Jeff Renfroe	David Hoselton	12 May 2016	4 July 2016	1.69
The trio investigate a small town where almost everyone died simultaneously with no visible cause. However Adelaide is distracted by the revelation that her husband faked his death, while Houdini continues to see his mother's ghost, and fears he is going mad.

== Reception ==
=== Ratings ===
Episode	U.S. ratings							Canadian ratings				United Kingdom ratings				
Episode	Original air date	Live		Rank (18–49)		Live+7		Original air date	Live+7	Rank (viewers)		Original air date	Live+7	Live+28	Rank (viewers)	
Episode	Original air date	Viewers (millions)	Rating/share (18–49)	Night	Week	Viewers (millions)	Rating/share (18–49)	Original air date	Viewers (millions)	Night	Week	Original air date	Viewers	Viewers	Night	Week
"The Maggie's Redress"	2 May 2016	2.62	0.7/2	2	TBA	TBA	TBA	2 May 2016	TBA	TBA	TBA	13 March 2016	93,000 (Note: Plus 18,000 on +1)	130,000	1	1
"A Dish of Adharma"	9 May 2016	2.36	0.6/2	2	TBA	TBA	TBA	9 May 2016	TBA	TBA	TBA	17 March 2016	93,000	145,000	1	1
"In Manus Dei"	16 May 2016	2.42	0.7/2	2	TBA	TBA	TBA	16 May 2016	TBA	TBA	TBA	24 March 2016	102,000	130,000	1	1
"Spring-Heel'd Jack"	23 May 2016	2.62	0.6/2	3	TBA	TBA	TBA	23 May 2016	TBA	TBA	TBA	31 March 2016	81,000	124,000	1	1 (Note: Ranked #2 for the week in Live+7.)
"The Curse of Korzha"	30 May 2016	2.02	0.5/1	2	TBA	TBA	TBA	30 May 2016	TBA	TBA	TBA	7 April 2016	99,000 (Note: Plus 10,000 on +1)	155,000	1	1
"The Monsters of Neithermoor"	6 June 2016	2.50	0.6/2	2	TBA	TBA	TBA	6 June 2016	TBA	TBA	TBA	14 April 2016	113,000 (Note: Plus 9,000 on +1)	139,000	1	1
"Bedlam"	13 June 2016	1.66	0.4/1	3	TBA	TBA	TBA	13 June 2016	TBA	TBA	TBA	21 April 2016	96,000 (Note: Plus 7,000 on +1)	122,000	1	1
"Strigoi"	20 June 2016	1.79	0.4/2	2	TBA	TBA	TBA	20 June 2016	TBA	TBA	TBA	28 April 2016	98,000	123,000	1	1
"Necromanteion"	27 June 2016	1.75	0.4/1	3	TBA	TBA	TBA	27 June 2016	TBA	TBA	TBA	5 May 2016	81,000	101,000	1	1
"The Pall of LaPier"	4 July 2016	1.69	0.4/2	2	TBA	TBA	TBA	4 July 2016	TBA	TBA	TBA	12 May 2016	69,000 (Note: Plus 7,000 on +1)	93,000	1	1
