= Coronation Street: Out of Africa =

- DVD cover art
- Directed by: Duncan Foster
- Written by: Joe Turner and Mark Wadlow
- Produced by: Gavin Blyth
- Starring: Wendi Peters; Jennie McAlpine; Sam Aston; Andrew Whyment; Katherine Kelly; Michelle Keegan; Brooke Vincent; Langley Kirkwood
- Production company: ITV Productions
- Distributed by: ITV DVD
- Release date: November 2008
- Running time: 107 minutes
- Countries: United Kingdom; South Africa
- Language: English

Coronation Street: Out of Africa is a 2008 direct-to-video film featuring characters from the British soap opera Coronation Street, who visit the luxury resort of Sun City, South Africa. Cilla Battersby-Brown (Wendi Peters), the mother from hell, brings her son and other "son" over to Africa to win a $500,000 competition.

== Plot ==
The story begins soon after John Stape's kidnapping of Rosie Webster was revealed in the main show. In the soap, Fiz Brown receives bad news from her mother, Cilla, about her brother, Chesney, who had recently gone with her friend and ex-boyfriend Kirk Sutherland to South Africa to see Cilla.

Fiz arrives in South Africa to make sure that Chesney was safe. Fiz finds Chesney in a wheelchair but it soon becomes clear that Cilla had lied about Chesney's accident and that Chesney is not in fact injured.

She is both relieved and angry, when they inform her this was all a scam to win a competition to find South Africa's best family. Fiz reluctantly agrees to participate when Chesney tells her that, if they win, Cilla has agreed to return to Weatherfield and be his mum. As part of the scam, Fiz is forced to pretend to be a nun, Kirk poses as Cilla's mentally disabled son, and Cilla's boyfriend Lesedi pretends to be their stepfather.

Fiz winds up falling for an AWOL South African soldier, Alex, who is working as a hotel security guard. He asks her to stay in South Africa with him, as he could not apply for a passport for fear of being court-martialed. Fiz agrees to stay in South Africa providing that Cilla will return to Weatherfield to look after Chesney.

Unfortunately, Cilla has no intention of keeping her promise. When Chesney overhears her true plans, he ruins the prize ceremony by telling everyone of Cilla's lies. They are disqualified, and Cilla vanishes.

A heartbroken Fiz had no choice but to tell Alex goodbye. She attempts, not very successfully, to convince him as well as herself that it had only been a holiday romance anyway. After one final kiss with Alex, Fiz returned to her life on the Street. In the closing moments, Cilla is crowned "Worst Mum" on South African television.

== Cast ==
Actor	Character
Wendi Peters	Cilla Battersby-Brown
Jennie McAlpine	Fiz Brown
Sam Aston	Chesney Battersby-Brown
Andrew Whyment	Kirk Sutherland
Katherine Kelly	Becky Granger
Michelle Keegan	Tina McIntyre
Brooke Vincent	Sophie Webster
Momelezi V. Ntshiba	Lesedi "Les" Mushapamwe
Tim Plewman	Alfie Vlok
Sibusiso Mamba	Rick
Kate Normington	Pamela Teal
Langley Kirkwood	Ed Teal
Lise Marie Richardson	Ellie Teal
Theo Landey	Alex
John Lata	Eric
