= Ralph & Katie =

British drama TV series

- Genre: Drama
- Created by: Peter Bowker
- Based on: The A Word by Peter Bowker
- Developed by: Peter Bowker
- Written by: Peter Bowker; Genevieve Barr; Annalisa D'Innella; Amy Trigg; Lizzie Watson; Tom Wentworth
- Directed by: Jordan Hogg
- Starring: Leon Harrop; Sarah Gordy; Pooky Quesnel
- Composer: Adrian Johnston
- Country of origin: United Kingdom
- Original language: English
- No. of series: 1
- No. of episodes: 6

Production
- Executive producers: Lucy Ritcher; Patrick Spence; Peter Bowker; Howard Burch
- Producer: Jules Hussey
- Cinematography: Ian Adrian
- Running time: 30 minutes
- Production companies: ITV Studios; Keshet Productions; Tiger Aspect Productions

Original release
- Network: BBC One
- Release: 5 October – 19 October 2022

Ralph & Katie is a 2022 British television drama series. It is a spin-off of The A Word, and is centred around the lives of a couple with Down syndrome. The six-part series, handled by a writing team made up predominantly of people with disabilities, began broadcast in October 2022. Disney+ picked up the programme across all of Europe, except the UK.

== Cast and characters ==
- Leon Harrop as Ralph Wilson
- Sarah Gordy as Katie Wilson
- Pooky Quesnel as Louise Wilson, Ralph's mother
- Dylan Brady as Danny
- Craig Cash as Brian
- Matt Greenwood as Tom Clarke
- Sam Retford as Gary

== Production ==
In August 2020 it was announced that a spin-off series, following the married life of characters from The A Word, had been commissioned by the BBC.

Filming began in February 2022 at Space Studios in Manchester and continued at various locations across the Lake District. As well as hiring an inclusive writing team, the production ran a six-month remote training scheme, on top of employing five entry level trainees, who had disabilities, across many of the departments during the shoot: relaying their experience to a further 30 Deaf, Disabled or Neurodivergent creatives through online sessions. The scheme allowed the DDN creatives who were early in their careers, a chance to familiarise themselves with various pieces of paperwork and meet the different members of crew responsible for the production. This scheme was funded by ITV Studios and BBC Drama and was made possible through DANC, the Disabled Artist's Network Community.

The production pioneered the transfer of the role of the creative coach from stage to screen, hiring Jess Mabel Jones to facilitate the needs of both the lead actors and director just before and during the filming of scenes. "I was there to make sure they could do the best job they could, and in an informed way." Jess would translate director's notes into an easy-read or spoken direction and would feed back on any adjustments to the script supervisor and editor on small adjustments that could help during filming.

Access All Areas, an inclusive theatre company, worked closely with the production, to advise on implementing inclusive innovations such as easy-read call sheets and mandatory name tags for all cast and crew members to wear to ensure everyone, regardless of whether they were DDN, could do their job more effectively. Jordan Hogg noted that "we asked everyone who came in the door, ‘What do you need to make your job better?" and said "As soon as we started shooting it became clear that this was a special project."

== Episodes ==
No.	Title	Directed by	Written by	Original release date
1	"A Friend in Need..."	Jordan Hogg	Peter Bowker	5 October 2022
2	"Valentine's Day"	Jordan Hogg	Amy Trigg	5 October 2022
3	"Babysitter's Club"	Jordan Hogg	Annalisa Dinnella	12 October 2022
4	"Empty Nest"	Jordan Hogg	Genevieve Barr	12 October 2022
5	"Ralph's Balls"	Jordan Hogg	Tom Wentworth	19 October 2022
6	"The Motherships Have Landed"	Jordan Hogg	Lizzie Watson	19 October 2022

== Reception ==
Jack Seale of The Guardian awarded the first two episodes four stars out of five, praising the humour, warmth and characters. Anita Singh in The Telegraph also gave it four stars out of five.

=== Awards and nominations ===
The series won Best Inclusive Practice at the RTS North West Awards 2023, as well as winning the Special Award at the RTS Design and Craft Awards 2023. The judges credited the production as "one of the most inclusive pieces of content that we've seen on screen for a long, long time", singling out Producer Jules Hussey and Director Jordan Hogg for leading an inclusive workplace that "celebrated diversity and supported a range of different accessibility needs".
