= David Titcher =

American screenwriter and producer

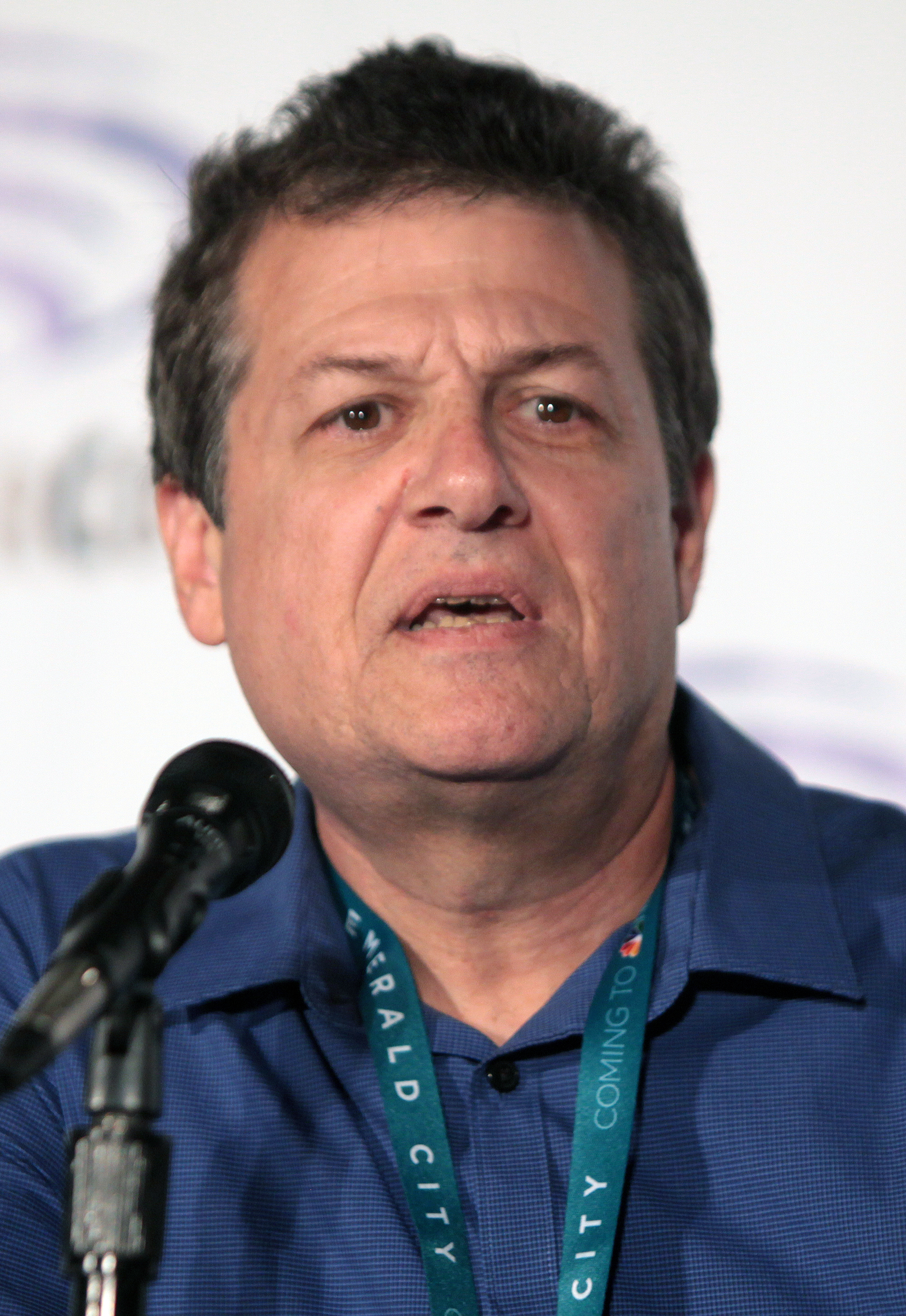
Titcher in 2016.

David N. Titcher is a screenwriter and producer. He is best known as the creator of The Librarian franchise, and writer of The Librarian: Quest for the Spear, The Curse of King Tut's Tomb, Around the World in 80 Days, Morgan Stewart's Coming Home, and Houdini & Doyle.

He is also credited as executive producer of Fox Network's Houdini & Doyle, co-producer of The Librarian: Quest for the Spear as well as a consulting producer on the TV series adaptation of the Librarian franchise, The Librarians, and co-executive producer on the Hallmark Channel's Be My Valentine.
