= Alma Zack =

Israeli actress (born 1970)

Alma Zack עלמה זק
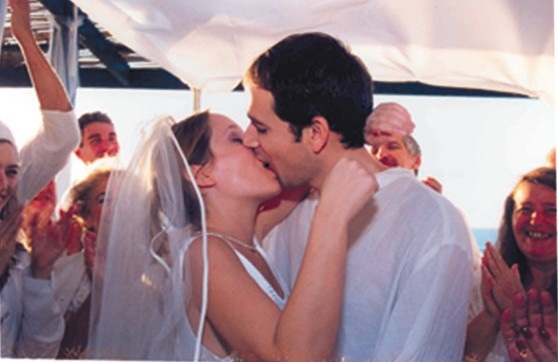
- Alma Zack and Guy Loel in the Wisdom of the Pretzel film.
- Born: 21 November 1970 (age 55); Tel Aviv, Israel
- Years active: 2000-present
- Partner: Alon Neumann
- Children: 2

Alma Zack (Hebrew: עלמה זק; born 21 November 1970) is an Israeli actress.

== Biography ==
Zack was born in Tel Aviv, Israel, in 1970 and grew up in Ramat Aviv. Her father is pianist Yonatan Zack and her mother is Adi Etzion, an actress and singer. She has a twin brother, Yoram, and an older brother, Dudi.

She attended the Herzliya Hebrew High School and served in the Israel Defense Forces as a psychotechnician. After her service, she studied acting at the Tel Aviv University, where her father taught music. She then worked as a flight attendant in El Al for a year. She played in a series and was an understudy in a play in the Gesher Theater.

In 2002, she had a role in the film The Wisdom of the Pretzel. She was auditioning for a program on Channel 1 when she was discovered by the editor of Eretz Nehederet, and joined the cast. In 2005 she joined the cast of Betipul, for which she shared the Israeli Television Award for best actress with Assi Levy (also for Betipul) in 2008. She also starred in the series I Didn't Promise You and Until the Wedding, and had a guest appearance on Mesudarim. In 2006 she sang on a Teapacks album.

In 2011 she played Ayelet in the Israeli television show Yellow Peppers.

== Filmography ==
- Chartzufim (1998)
- Shemesh (1998)
- Eretz Ktana Ish Gadol (1998)
- Ha'matzav (2001)
- Ha-Chaim Ze Lo Hacol (2001)
- The Wisdom of the Pretzel (2002)
- Eretz Nehederet (2003-present)
- BeTipul (2005)
- I Didn't Promise You
- Until the Wedding
- Mesudarim (2007)
- Yellow Peppers (2011)
- Life is a Tough Period (2024)

== Personal life ==
Her partner until 2023 is actor Alon Neumann, They have two daughters.
