= Call Me Vicky (play) =

Play written by Nicola Bland and Stacey Bland

- Written by: Nicola Bland and Stacey Bland
- Setting: Soho, London; Elephant and Castle, London

Premiere
- Date: 2019

Call Me Vicky is a play written by sisters Nicola Bland and Stacey Bland and first performed in 2019 at The Pleasance Theatre, London.

== Background ==
The debut play from sisters Nicola and Stacey Bland is based on an entirely true story, which had been kept secret within their family for many years. The character of Vicky is the sisters' real-life aunty and the character of Debbie, their real-life mother. The writers discovered when they reached adulthood that Vicky was born biologically male and had transitioned before they were born. They began to hear stories from their mother, Vicky, and Vicky's mother about her journey from male to female, with all the trials and tribulations that ensued. The sisters, independently of each other, began writing about the stories they'd been told. And upon discovering that they had each starting writing about it, they teamed up to create the play text subsequently published and performed.

== Synopsis ==
The play charts Vicky's journey through five years of her life from 1980 to 1985. The story begins with Vicky and best friend Debbie getting ready for a night out in the council flat in Elephant and Castle where Vicky lives with her mother, Sylvie. The two visit the Golden Girl club in the backstreets of Soho where Vicky goes on to find work as a drag queen, alongside her various jobs in the sex work industry; all in aid to save up for her sex reassignment surgery. Drugs and other illegal acts ensue until an encounter with a prospective client goes wrong and Vicky finds herself in prison, at the mercy of abusive prison officers and fellow inmates. Throughout all of this, Vicky manages to find love in the form of Sid, whom she met at the Golden Girl club earlier in the story, and mends her tumultuous relationship with her mother. The play ends five years from when we first meet Vicky and her friends and family. Vicky has had her long-awaited surgery and has settled down with Sid, and the closing scene ends with the revelation that best friend Debbie is expecting a baby, and Vicky is to become an aunty.

== Theatrical Production ==
Call Me Vicky was first performed at The Pleasance Theatre, London from February to March 2019 as part of The Pleasance Theatre's #YouWillKnowTheirNames season. Directed by Victoria Gimby, the cast included Wendi Peters as Vicky's mum, Sylvie; Matt Greenwood as Vicky; Nicola Bland as Vicky's best friend, Debbie; Ben Welch as drag queen, Fat Pearl; Adam Young as Vicky's love interest, Sid; and Stacey Victoria Bland as Vicky's friend, Gabby.

In November 2019, writer Stacey Bland revealed on Twitter that she and her sister and co-writer Nicola Bland were working on turning the stage play into a screen play, following a successful theatrical run.

== Reception ==
The play's debut run received widespread praise from critics. Upper Circle Theatre observed: "Beautifully written, directed and acted, Call Me Vicky reminds us how far we’ve come yet how much further we still need to go regarding rights and acceptance with the transgender community." Theatre Things wrote: "A powerful, eye-opening debut from Nicola and Stacey Bland, Call Me Vicky is well worth a watch."

The debut production also received much praise for the performances of Peters and Greenwood, and garnered five nominations for the 2019 The Offies: Best Male Performance in a Play (Matt Greenwood); Best Supporting Female Performance in a Play (Wendi Peters); Best Supporting Female in a Play (Stacey Victoria Bland); Best Supporting Male in a Play (Ben Welch); and Best Costume Design in a Play (Martha Hegarty).
