= Julia Krynke =

Polish actress and voice artist

- Born: 20 November 1979 (age 46); Opole, Poland
- Occupations: Actress, voice artist
- Years active: 1998–present

Julia Krynke (born 20 November 1979) is a multilingual Polish actress, voice over artist and trained classical musician based in London, UK. She has had minor supporting roles in the UK in TV series Spooks, Holby City and The Street, and has had a successful career in cinema, theatre and TV in Germany, Poland and Ireland. She is fluent in Polish, English and German.

== Education ==
Krynke is a graduate of the Ludwik Solski Academy for the Dramatic Arts in Wroclaw, Poland (1998–2002) and the Centre for Theatre Practices, Gardzienice, Poland (2001–2003) and has attended the Michael Chekhov Studio London, UK (2008–). She studied Grand Piano and Flute at the State Music School (1986–1997) in Opole, Poland.

== Career ==
Julia Krynke has worked extensively in film, television and theatre in Poland, Germany, Ireland, and the UK.

Soon after the completion of her studies, Krynke made her big-screen debut playing one of the lead roles in the much-acclaimed Distant Lights, directed by Hans-Christian Schmid (Germany, 2003). The film received many awards – including the FIPRESCI prize and the German Critics' Association Award – and was nominated for the Golden Bear at The Berlin Film Festival.

From 2003 to 2008, Krynke went on to appear in a number of popular Polish television series whilst performing full-time in the Teatr Polski (Warsaw), Teatr Nowy (Poznan), Teatr Nowy (Lodz) and Scena in Vitro (Lublin).

In 2006, Krynke made a well-received debut on the Irish stage as Monica in Dermot Bolger's The Townlands of Brazil (dir. Ray Yeates).

In 2007, Krynke appeared regularly as Mela in the Irish television series The English Class.

In 2008, Krynke moved to London to take classes at the Michael Chekhov Studio. She has been based in London since.

From 2009 onwards, Krynke took a series of further English-speaking parts, most notable of which was that of Olenka in the Bafta award-winning BBC drama series The Street (wr. Jimmy McGovern dir. David Blair). She also played Bibi Saparova in season eight of Spooks (dir. Alrick Riley).

During the same period, Krynke also featured in televised roles in Germany, including that of Olga Sarpei in the ZDF series Leipzig Homicide.

In 2012, Krynke took a lead televised role – Milena Kintrup – in the German-Austrian-Swiss series Tatort: Das Wunder von Wolbeck (dir. Matthias Tiefenbacher).

In 2013, Polish audiences could watch her as Mira Ziemska in the television series Medics (dir. Marcin Wrona) and she also appeared in a BBC TV series Casualty as Ania.

In 2014, Krynke featured in season 2 of Line of Duty as Kasia.

2015 saw Krynke portray Julia Katrin Vesik in the British TV series DCI Banks (ITV) and Agnieszka in the German television movie Der Pfarrer und das Mädchen (ZDF, dir. Maris Pfeiffer). In the same year she also appeared in The Avengers: Age of Ultron (dir. Joss Whedon).

In 2016, Krynke joined BBC series The A Word as Maya Petrenko in season 1, starred with Nabil Elouahabi in the independent British-Jordanian-Iranian feature film Undocument and featured as Natascha Karpenko in a German crime TV series Ein starkes Team: Tödliche Botschaft.

Krynke works regularly with European independent film-makers. She starred in German director's Saschko Frey's Echos (2009), winner of the Friedrich-Wilhelm Murnau Kurzfilmpreis. She made the experimental noir Muse with Italian film-maker Massimo Salvato and has collaborated with British directors Jessica Townsend,Esther Richardson and Nick Cohen and Kyla Simone Bruce.

Krynke has won theatrical prizes in her native Poland. She was the first contestant ever to receive all three major awards in one year at 20th Festival of Theatre Schools in 2002: the Best Actor Award, Audience Award and Critics' Award for the role of Gileta in the play The Topsy-Turvy Princess (wr. Calderon de la Barca, dir. Remigiusz Brzyk). Krynke was also given Second Prize in the Ogolnopolski Przeglad Piosenki Aktorskiej in Zamosc (a Polish singing contest for actors).

== Filmography ==
Year	Title	Role	Notes
2021	Ridley Road	Roza	BBC One TV series
2019	The Pleasure Principle	Tamara	TV series
2019	Slad	Krystyna Winnicka	TV series
2019	Notruf Hafenkante	Cristina Hagi	TV series
2018	Die Kanzlei	Regina Meissner	TV series
2018	Leash	Alicja	Short
2018	Sick of It	Dobrosława	TV series
2016	Undocument	Laura	
2016	The A Word	Maya Petrenko	TV series
2016	Ein starkes Team	Natascha Karpenko	TV series
2015	Avengers: Age of Ultron	Sokovian Driver	
2015	Der Pfarrer und das Mädchen	Agnieszka	TV film
2015	DCI Banks	Katrin Vesik	TV series
2014	The Game	Embassy Women	TV series
2014	Line of Duty	Kasia	TV series
2013	Casualty	Ania	TV series
2013	Flight	Lule	Short
2013	Medics	Mira Ziemska	TV series
2012	Tatort	Milena Kintrup	TV film
2012	The Split Second	Adriana	Short
2012	Mind Closure	Zoe	Short
2011	Holby City	Ania Green	TV series
2011	Lessons in Lifesaving	Nikki	
2010	Trivia	Danuta	TV series
2010	Humane Resources	Recruitment Consultant	
2010	Cake	Agata	
2010	Erratum	Edyta	
2009	The Street	Olenka	TV series
2009	Leipzig Homicide	Bibi Saparova	TV series
2009	Spooks	Bibi Saparova	TV series
2009	Muse	Ludmilla	Short
2008	Foxes	Anna	
2007	The English Class	Mela	TV series
2007	Die Echoes	Lydia	Short
2007	Plebania	Monika	TV series
2007	Odwroceni	Journalist	
2006	First Love	Julia Derwisz	TV series
2006	Smell of the Coffee	Ruda	
2005	Kryminalni	Anna Rybik	TV series
2005	AugenBlick	Ana	Short
2005	Triangle of Incidents	Magda	Short
2005	Lesson	French Teacher	Short
2004	Trzy kropki	Mother, Daughter	Short
2003	Kasia i Tomek	Edyta Kartacz	TV series
2003	Distant Lights	Beata	

== Awards and honours ==
- 1st Actors' Award for the roles of Gileta and Kaleria at the 20th Festival of Theatre Schools, Lodz 2002
- Critics'Award for Actor's Individuality at the 20th Festival of Theatre Schools, Lodz 2002
- Audience Award for the role of Gileta at the 20th Festival of Theatre Schools, Lodz 2002
- 2nd Award in Ogolnopolski Przeglad Piosenki Aktorskiej (Nationwide contest for an Actor-performed song), Zamosc 1998

== Theatre ==
- 2009: Dementia Diaries by Maria Jastrzebska as Mrs Alicja (directed by Mark C. Hewitt, Blank Productions)
- 2008: Nic co ludzkie by Artur Palyga as Maria, Antonina, Szara (directed by Pawel Passini, Piotr Ratajczak, Luksz Witt-Michalowski, The World Premiere Scene InVitro in Lublin)
- 2006: The Townlands of Brazil by Dermot Bolger as Monica (directed by Ray Yeates, Axis Arts Centre, Dublin)
- 2005: Zona Tenebrarum based on Steppenwolf by Herman Hesse and Asketike: Salvatores dei by Nikos Kazantzakis as Hermina (directed by Przemyslaw Wasilkowski, Torino/Warsaw)
- 2005: Tinderbox based on the story by Hans-Christian Andersen as Princess (directed by Katarzyna Deszcz, The New Theatre in Lodz)
- 2005: Run For Your Wife by Ray Cooney as Barbara Smith (directed by Ryszard Nyczka, The New Theatre in Lodz)
- 2005: Dulle Griet by Stanislaw Grochowiak as Naga (directed by Marek Pasieczny, The New Theatre in Lodz)
- 2004: The Secret Garden by Frances Hodgson Burnett as Mary Lennox (directed by Karol Suszka, The New Theatre in Lodz)
- 2004: Warsaw Uprising: A Mother’s Story by Kaz Braun as Elzbieta (directed by Kaz Braun, The New Theatre in Lodz)
- 2004: Friar Minor by Stanislaw Brejdygant as Maria (directed by Stanislaw Brejdygant, The New Theatre in Lodz)
- 2004: On the Heights of Despair by Marcin Jarnuszkiewicz as Lady (Marcin Jarnuszkiewicz, The New Theatre in Lodz)
- 2003: Dozywocie by Aleksander Fredro as Rozia (directed by Szczepan Szczykno, The New Theatre in Lodz)
- 2003: Jealousy by Esther Vilar as Iris (Aldona Figura, The New Theatre, in Lodz)
- 2002: The Adventures of Sindbad the Sailor adapted by Boleslaw Lesmian as Sea Devil (directed by Jarosław Kilian, The Polish Theatre in Warsaw)
- 2002: Ksiezniczka na opak wywrocona by Pedro Calderon de la Barca as Gileta (directed by Remigiusz Brzyk, National Theatre Academy in Wroclaw)
- 2002: Summerfolk by Maxim Gorky as Kaleria (directed by Bozena Baranowska, National Theatre Academy in Wroclaw)
- 2002: The Wedding by Stanislaw Wyspianski as Zosia (directed by Janusz Wisniewski, The New Theatre in Poznan)

== Musical Score Composing ==
- 2002: Summerfolk by Maxim Gorky as A scene (directed by Bozena Baranowska, National Theatre Academy in Wroclaw)
