= Yellow Peppers =

- Genre: Drama
- Created by: Keren Margalit
- Written by: Keren Margalit
- Directed by: Keren Margalit; Amnon Kotler
- Starring: Alma Zack; Yossi Marshak; Ori Pfeffer; Yael Schtamler; Yehuda Barkan; Rozina Cambos; Maya Maoz
- Country of origin: Israel
- Original language: Hebrew
- No. of series: 2
- No. of episodes: 26

Production
- Executive producers: Eilon Rechakovski; Yohanan Karedo
- Production location: Moshav Nir Tzvi
- Editors: Einat Glazer-Zarhin; Arik Liebovitz
- Running time: 40-45 minutes
- Production companies: July August Productions, Keshet Broadcasting

Original release
- Network: Channel 2
- Release: December 18, 2010 – April 3, 2014

Related
- The A Word

Yellow Peppers (Hebrew: פלפלים צהובים; Pilpelim Tzehubim) is an Israeli drama television program about a family that raises an autistic child in a rural village lacking any therapeutic resources. The programme was well received by critics. It was also presented as a part to the World Autism Awareness Day at the United Nations.

== Plot ==
Ayellet (Alma Zack) makes good money as the village tailor, and when her father, Meir (Yehuda Barkan), gets involved in agricultural politics, her husband, Yaniv, turns the family farm into a profitable business exporting yellow peppers. Both men help her raise Natty, her teenage daughter from a former marriage, and Omri, her toddler son from her present one. The few indications she has of Omri's developmental problems do not bother her, because the village physician says everything is okay.

When Ayellet's brother, Avishay (Ori Pfeffer), returns to the village, it seems like a new opportunity: Avishay will replace Yaniv in the greenhouses, and Yaniv will build their new biker restaurant. However, Avishay's wife, Yaely, a physician, wants to give her marriage a second chance and comes with her husband to live on the farm. Yaely is concerned about Omri's symptoms. Meir drives the child to the closest town, where he is diagnosed as autistic.

Ayellet removes Omri from kindergarten, and the family organizes an intensive therapeutic homeschooling plan. Ayellet stops spending time with her daughter and stops working. No money is left for completing the restaurant. Ayellet fires her brother from his job managing the greenhouses. He becomes depressed and leaves his wife. Yaniv stops participating in the homeschooling.

Yaniv wants that Ayellet and he should try for another child, but she refuses.

Yaniv fights with Ayellet about taking Omri to community events. Yaniv wants to take him to a party at the preschool, but Omri disappears. Yaniv forces Ayellet to tell the police and the village, who are searching for Omri, that he is autistic. The family explains to everyone that Omri does not answer to his name. When night falls, Omri is found in the preschool.

== British version ==
A British version, The A Word, began screening on the BBC in March/April 2016. As of 2020, there have been three series.

== Greek version ==
A Greek version, The Word You Don’t Say (Η λέξη που δεν λες) was produced in Greece in 2016.

== Dutch version ==
A Dutch version, Het A-woord, began screening by the Evangelische Omroep in September 2020.

== American version ==
An American version, The A Word, was in development at NBC and will be a co-production between Keshet Studios and Universal Television with Arika Lisanne Mittman as writer.
