= The Street (British TV series) =

- The Street title sequence
- Genre: Drama
- Created by: Jimmy McGovern
- Written by: Jimmy McGovern; Danny Brocklehurst; Marc Pye; Alice Nutter
- Directed by: David Blair
- Composers: Robert Lane (Series 1); John Lunn (Series 2); Adrian Johnston (Series 3)
- Country of origin: United Kingdom
- Original language: English
- No. of series: 3
- No. of episodes: 18

Production
- Executive producers: Jimmy McGovern; Sita Williams
- Producers: Ken Horn (Series 1); John Chapman (Series 2); Matthew Bird (Series 3)
- Running time: 60 minutes

Original release
- Network: BBC One
- Release: 13 April 2006 – 17 August 2009

The Street is a British drama television series created by Jimmy McGovern and produced by Granada Television for the BBC. The series follows the lives of various residents of an unnamed street in Manchester and features an all-star cast including Timothy Spall, Stephen Graham, Jim Broadbent, Jane Horrocks, Bob Hoskins, and David Thewlis.

The Street won both the British Academy Television Award for Best Drama Series and RTS Television Award for Drama Series twice, in 2007 and 2008. It also won two International Emmy Awards in November 2007 for Best Drama and Best Actor (Jim Broadbent). The second series was nominated for the Best Drama prize at the 2008 Rose d'Or ceremony. Though it did not win, it received Special Mention from the jury. In November 2010, the third series won the International Emmy Award for Best Drama and Best Actor (Bob Hoskins).

The third series began airing on 13 July 2009 and concluded on 17 August 2009. This was the final series to be made due to cutbacks at ITV Studios in Manchester (ITV produced the series, although it is shown by the BBC).

The filming location was Rock Street, Higher Broughton in Salford.

== Cast ==
The McEvoys are the only family to appear in more than one series, with Timothy Spall and Ger Ryan reprising the roles of Eddie and Margie for at least one episode per series.

=== Series 1 (2006) ===
- Jane Horrocks as Angela Quinn
- Daniel Ryan as Arthur Quinn
- Dean McGonagle as Jamie Quinn
- Alexandra Pearson as Katy Quinn
- Shaun Dooley as Peter Harper
- Liz White as Eileen Harper
- Timothy Spall as Eddie McEvoy
- Ger Ryan as Margie McEvoy
- Jim Broadbent as Stan McDermott
- Sue Johnston as Brenda McDermott
- Neil Dudgeon as Brian Peterson
- Lindsey Coulson as Ann Peterson
- Sacha Parkinson as Shannon Peterson
- Lee Battle as Connor Peterson
- Jody Latham as Billy Roberts
- David Schofield as John Roberts
- Ciarán Griffiths as Terry
- Christine Bottomley as Yvonne O'Neill
- Lee Ingleby as Sean O'Neill
- Joanne Froggatt as Kerry
- Bronagh Gallagher as Mary Jennerson
- Steve Edge as Malcolm McKenzie
- Matthew Marsh as Bob Hewitt
- Steve Marsh as Duffy
- Jamiu Adebiyi as Ojo Asemi
- Jessica Hall as Laura Hammond
- Claire Hackett as Rachel Marsden

=== Series 2 (2007) ===
- Mark Benton as Wayne Taylor
- Melanie Hill as Val Taylor
- Michael Taylor as Damien Wood
- Vincent Regan as Charlie Morgan
- Julia Ford as Roz Morgan
- Will Mellor as Tom Dixon
- Kieran Bew as Gary Parr
- Gina McKee as Jan Parr
- Lorcan Cranitch as Danny Parr
- Matt Smith as Ian Hanley
- Oliver Stokes as Lee Hanley
- Lorraine Ashbourne as Cath Hanley
- Timothy Spall as Eddie McEvoy
- Ger Ryan as Margie McEvoy
- Matthew Marsh as Bob Hewitt
- Kim Thomson as Pat Tinsey
- David Thewlis as Harry and Joe Jennerson
- Bronagh Gallagher as Mary Jennerson
- June Watson as Maggie Jennerson
- Toby Kebbell as Paul Billerton
- Robyn Addison as Kirsty Blackwell
- Dean Andrews as Cleggy
- Jodhi May as Jean Arthur
- Jack Deam as Kevin Arthur

=== Series 3 (2009) ===
- Bob Hoskins as Paddy Gargan
- Frances Barber as Lizzie Gargan
- Liam Cunningham as Thomas Miller
- Anna Friel as Dee Purnell
- Daniel Mays as Mark Raveley
- David Bradley as Joe Raveley
- Jonas Armstrong as Nick Calshaw
- Siobhan Finneran as Kim Calshaw
- Ian Puleston-Davies as Alan Calshaw
- Emily Beecham as Gemma Robinson
- Joseph Mawle as Kieran Corrigan
- Julia Krynke as Olenka Danczuk
- Steve Marsh as Duffy
- Stephen Graham as Shay Ryan
- Maxine Peake as Madeleine Collins
- Timothy Spall as Eddie McEvoy
- Ger Ryan as Margie McEvoy
- Ruth Jones as Sandra Lucas
- Daniel Rigby as David Walsh
- Ted Robbins as Ken Jones
- Nick Fraser as Deano Jackson

== Episodes ==
=== Series 1 (2006) ===
| No. | Title | Directed by | Written by | Original release date | UK viewers (millions) |
|---|---|---|---|---|---|
| 1 | "The Accident" | David Blair | Jimmy McGovern | 13 April 2006 | 5.67 |
Married mother of three Angela Quinn (Jane Horrocks) decides to spice up her life by embarking on an affair with one of her neighbours. But when someone is run down in a car accident, the residents are forced to take a close look at their own lives.
| 2 | "Stan" | David Blair | Jimmy McGovern | 20 April 2006 | 5.47 |
When Stan (Jim Broadbent) approaches 65, he is forced to retire. Tired of living a pensioners' lifestyle, in an attempt to get his pension to pay out to his wife Brenda (Sue Johnston), he decides to die by suicide.
| 3 | "The Flasher" | Terry McDonough | Marc Pye | 27 April 2006 | 4.40 |
Brian (Neil Dudgeon) is accused of flashing in the local park. When the news begins to spread around the school where he works, pupils start making malicious accusations. Under pressure from the local community, Brian's wife Ann (Lindsey Coulson) starts to disbelieve him.
| 4 | "Football" | Terry McDonough | Alan Field | 4 May 2006 | 3.74 |
When Billy (Jody Latham) steals a pair of trainers, he is sacked from the local football club where he works. As his behaviour starts on a downward spiral, he is then tempted into the lucrative life of drug dealing.
| 5 | "Asylum" | David Blair | James Quirk | 11 May 2006 | 4.54 |
Eddie (Timothy Spall) takes a non-English speaking asylum seeker on a fare and, after failing to find somewhere to drop him off, he invites him to stay at his house. This causes tension between him and his wife, Margi (Ger Ryan), driving her to leave him. In her absence, the two forge an unlikely friendship.
| 6 | "Sean & Yvonne" | David Blair | Arthur Ellison | 18 May 2006 | N/A |
Sean (Lee Ingleby) and Yvonne (Christine Bottomley) have an unhappy marriage. Sean regularly loses his temper and beats up Yvonne. She finds the strength to leave him, changing the locks while he's out, but the strain proves too much for Yvonne's mum, Mary (Ruth McCabe), so Yvonne and sister Kerry (Joanne Froggatt) take revenge.

=== Series 2 (2007) ===
| No. overall | No. in series | Title | Directed by | Written by | Original release date | UK viewers (millions) |
|---|---|---|---|---|---|---|
| 7 | 1 | "Twin" | Terry McDonough | Arthur Ellison | 8 November 2007 | 5.38 |
Joe Jennerson (David Thewlis) envies his identical twin brother, Harry. His sibling has the freedom of a comfortable bachelor lifestyle, funded by a generous army pension, while Joe is in a dead-end job, with no money, squabbling children, a live-in mother, Maggie (June Watson), and a wife, Mary (Bronagh Gallagher), who he thinks has fallen out of love with him. As the brothers watch a football match on television one evening, Harry chokes on a sweet and loses consciousness. As Joe waits for the ambulance to arrive, he realises that the chance of a lifetime is staring him in the face, and swaps clothes, taking on the identity of Harry. The assumed body of Joe is presumed dead at the hospital, while the real Joe is left comforting his wife, Mary, under the pretense that he is her brother-in-law.
| 8 | 2 | "Old Flame" | David Blair | Andy Lynch | 15 November 2007 | 4.95 |
Eddie (Timothy Spall) meets old friend Bob Hewitt (Matthew Marsh) and finds he is married to his own first love, Pat (Kim Thomson). Accepting Bob's invitation to a charity event, Eddie is out to impress Pat. Eddie's wife, Margie (Ger Ryan) discovers a lump on her breast and cancels her evening out, but Eddie is in no state to recognise her trauma.
| 9 | 3 | "Demolition" | Terry McDonough | Jimmy McGovern & Danny Brocklehurst | 22 November 2007 | N/A |
Demolition man Charlie (Vincent Regan) works away from home, leaving wife Roz (Julia Ford) at home with their teenage children Luke and Leah. At the end of a gruelling day, the crew get drunk, before Charlie retires to the room he is sharing with fellow worker Tom (Will Mellor), but Charlie is taken aback by Tom's actions.
| 10 | 4 | "Taxi" | Terry McDonough | Roy Boulter | 29 November 2007 | N/A |
After a pub crawl, cousins Gary (Kieran Bew) and Ian (Matt Smith) become involved in an altercation with a taxi driver. Ian stays to help the injured cabbie, but Gary runs away before he is caught. As other cab drivers arrive at the scene, they assume Ian must be guilty and he is eventually arrested. Jan (Gina McKee), Gary's mum, suspects her son isn't as innocent as he claims – but how far will she go to protect him?
| 11 | 5 | "The Letter" | Terry McDonough | Alice Nutter | 6 December 2007 | 5.26 |
For postman Wayne (Mark Benton), life on the street has been less than kind recently. His wife Val (Melanie Hill) has left him, taking their two sons and the dog; his back is deteriorating, which makes his postal round harder by the day; and he has no money. A potentially good night out speed-dating is ruined when Wayne takes a shine to Rachel, who has a stammer that Wayne seems incapable of being sympathetic about. Now at his lowest ebb, Wayne thinks his problems could be solved if only he could have a new start, somewhere nice and hot, like Greece. With a newfound determination, Wayne adopts a new approach to his work whereby he opens the mail that is addressed to the wealthier parts of the neighbourhood and removes any cash, before delivering the rest. Meanwhile, 15-year-old illiterate truant Damien (Michael Taylor) has been watching Wayne closely and confronts him. Not wanting to lose his job, Wayne suggests that Damien help him with the heavy work. Damien takes the opportunity to earn some money whilst learning how to read.
| 12 | 6 | "The Promise" | David Blair | Jimmy McGovern | 13 December 2007 | N/A |
Paul (Toby Kebbell) strikes up a relationship with a local girl, but eventually drives her away when he mentions that he has a terrible secret. After catching sight of a woman one night, Paul runs home to consume a cocktail of whiskey and paracetamols, but when she follows him home, it begins a journey to his redemption – and their reconciliation.

=== Series 3 (2009) ===
| No. overall | No. in series | Title | Directed by | Written by | Original release date | UK viewers (millions) |
|---|---|---|---|---|---|---|
| 13 | 1 | "Smoke" | David Blair | Jimmy McGovern | 13 July 2009 | 5.65 |
Paddy (Bob Hoskins), landlord of the Greyhound pub, bans hoodlum Callum Miller for smoking on the premises. This antagonises the boy's father, Tom (Liam Cunningham), who has a violent reputation. He threatens to harm Paddy if the ban is not lifted by the next afternoon. But when Paddy tries to rally support from the other locals, he finds it difficult to find anybody who is prepared to stand up to him.
| 14 | 2 | "Meet the Parents" | Terry McDonough | Jan McVerry | 20 July 2009 | 5.74 |
Dee (Anna Friel) is a single mother with two children, facing endless financial hardship and having to work two jobs to make ends meet. Mark (Daniel Mays) is a plumber, also a single parent, who comes out to fix Dee's heating system. When they date, he introduces her to his parents, Nessa and Joe. Though Nessa welcomes Dee, Joe is less welcoming, as he knows Dee secretly works as a prostitute at a strip club – as he has been one of her clients.
| 15 | 3 | "Scar" | Terry McDonough | Esther Wilson | 27 July 2009 | 4.91 |
After a Muslim suicide bomber attack whilst on duty in Afghanistan, soldier Nick (Jonas Armstrong) returns home with half of his face terribly scarred. His family and schoolteacher girlfriend Gemma (Emily Beecham) are horrified, but try to act normally for his sake. Nick, however, cannot cope with the situation or come to terms with the horror that he went through. Following a row with Gemma, he tries to kill himself by deliberately stepping in front of a taxi – the driver of which happens to be a Muslim.
| 16 | 4 | "The Hero" | David Blair | Peter Lloyd | 3 August 2009 | 4.70 |
Kieran (Joseph Mawle) resents all foreigners. He abuses Polish bus drivers, barks at the African staff in the kitchen where he is head chef, and walks out of a blind date with a black woman. He then becomes a local hero when he takes the credit for saving a seven-year-old Polish girl from a house fire. This in turn leads him into a romantic relationship with the girl's mother, Olenka (Julia Krynke), a Polish immigrant. He, however, finds it difficult to tell her that her daughter's real saviour was Duffy (Steve Marsh), his good friend who dare not take credit for the act of heroism as he is claiming Invalidity Benefit.
| 17 | 5 | "Past Life" | David Blair | Jimmy McGovern & Anthony Gannie | 10 August 2009 | 4.55 |
Shay (Stephen Graham) is the alcoholic manager of a betting shop. One day, ex-girlfriend Madeleine (Maxine Peake) turns up out of the blue to tell him he has a 16-year-old son, Otto, who wants to see him. Shay is elated that his empty life may finally have some meaning, until he discovers that Otto has Down's syndrome. After initially rejecting him, Shay then tries to be a good father to the son he never knew – but his alcoholism costs him his job, then his home, and then even Otto himself.
| 18 | 6 | "Loss of Control" | David Blair | Jimmy McGovern & Andy Lynch | 17 August 2009 | 4.88 |
Eddie (Timothy Spall) is annoyed when wife Margie (Ger Ryan) opts to spend time with her abusive father after he has suffered a stroke, leaving him and his young son at home. Having lost his driving licence, he now works on the phones at Alpha-Zero Cabs, along with lonely Sandra (Ruth Jones). The two of them grow closer and end up in bed together, unfortunately on a night when Margie returns home early. Unable to live with the guilt, Eddie confesses all to Margie – which leads to tragic consequences.

== Reception ==
The Street was critically applauded during its three-year run. TV critic Nancy-Banks Smith writing for The Guardian praised "The Promise" episode from Series 2: "Everyone involved seems to have appreciated the little gem they had here. Jodhi May, acting half the time with only half her face, was almost too powerful for peace of mind. David Blair directed like a particularly gifted spider, filling the screen with holes, cracks, doorways, windows...This, the last and best play in The Street series, must have been as painful and exhilarating to write as it was to watch. I wouldn't say it was plausible. I'd say poetic."
