= Space Studios Manchester =

Film and television studio complex in Manchester

- Location within Greater Manchester
- Former names: The Space Project
- Alternative names: Space Studios

General information
- Type: Film and television studios
- Location: Space Studios Manchester, Vaughan Street, West Gorton, Manchester, M12 5FQ, United Kingdom
- Coordinates: 53.469154°N 2.2008608°W
- Completed: May 2014
- Owner: Manchester City Council

Technical details
- Floor area: 85,000 sq. ft.

Design and construction
- Main contractor: VINCI Construction

Website
- Official website

Space Studios Manchester (formerly known as The Space Project) is an English purpose built film and television studio situated in Gorton, Manchester, with 6 acoustically treated stages.

Construction began in 2013 and it opened in October 2014 as a spin off to The Sharp Project. It is currently 360,000 square feet in size, which includes 85,000 square feet of studio space, with plans to expand the site further. Productions filmed at the facility include The A Word, Houdini and Doyle and stunt scenes used in Coronation Street. It is also now the home for the BBC's Dragons' Den.
