= Wendi Peters =

English actress

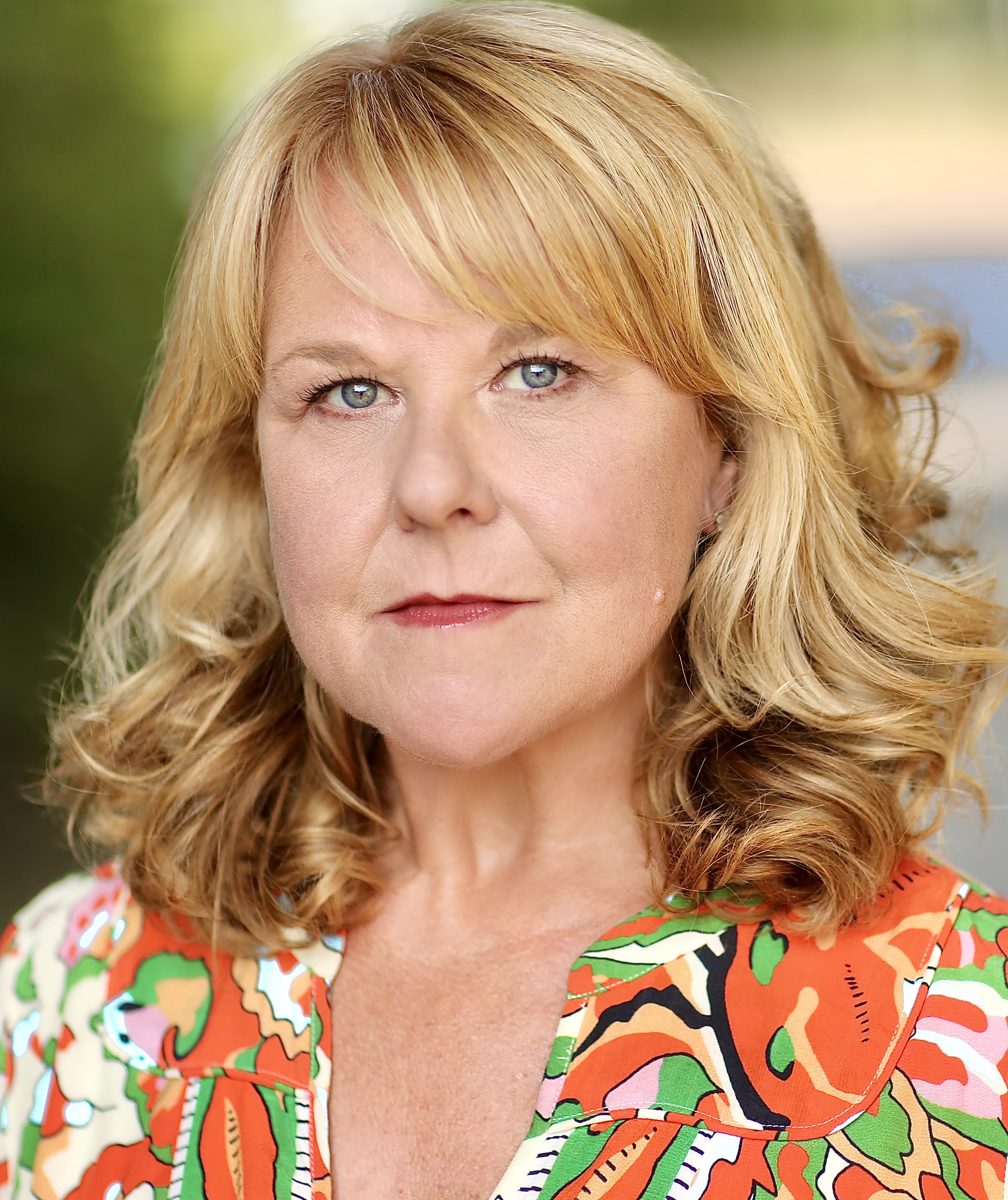
- Peters in 2024
- Born: Wendi Louise Dawson; 29 February 1968 (age 58); Blackburn, Lancashire, England
- Occupation: Actress
- Years active: 1987–present
- Television: Bad Girls; Coronation Street; Doctors
- Spouse: Kenny Linden (m. 1993–2022)
- Children: 1

Wendi Louise Peters (born 29 February 1968) is an English actress. Peters began her acting career in theatre, with appearances in various productions including The Scarlet Pimpernel (1991), Guys and Dolls (1991), Into the Woods (1992), Bedroom Farce (1996) and Noises Off (1997). Then from 2003 to 2007 and again in 2014, she portrayed Cilla Battersby-Brown in the ITV soap opera Coronation Street.

After leaving Coronation Street to pursue other opportunities, she competed in and reached the final of Celebrity MasterChef, before returning to the stage to appear in various touring productions and West End theatre roles. She reprised her role of Cilla in 2014 for a brief stint, before appearing in the CBBC series Hetty Feather from 2015 to 2017. Then from 2023 to 2024, Peters appeared as Nina Bulsara in the BBC daytime soap opera Doctors.

== Life and career ==
=== 1987–2010: Career beginnings and Coronation Street ===
Peters was born in Blackburn, Lancashire on 29 February 1968 making her a Leapling. As a child, Peters attended dance school and performed in various school plays. She has cited seeing Annie on the West End in 1980 as the catalyst for her wanting to pursue acting for her career. Her professional acting career began in 1987 when she performed at the Crucible Theatre, Sheffield. In 1992, she portrayed Red Riding Hood in a stage production of Into the Woods, a role Peters described as one of her favourites in a 2021 interview. After various stage roles including The Scarlet Pimpernel (1991), Guys and Dolls (1991), Bedroom Farce (1996) and Noises Off (1997), Peters made her television debut four years later in the BBC medical drama series Cardiac Arrest. She then appeared in minor roles in Out of the Blue and Bad Girls.

In 2003, Peters was cast in the role of Cilla Battersby-Brown in the ITV soap opera Coronation Street. In January 2006, she competed on ITV's Soapstar Superstar, raising £35,000 for her chosen charities. In January 2007, it was announced that Peters would be leaving the soap after four years. She made the decision as a result of wanting to spend more time with family alongside pursuing other projects. She reprised the role in 2008 as part of a straight-to-DVD special, Out of Africa. Also in 2008, Peters appeared on Adrenaline Junkie with Jack Osborne, where she jumped out of a helicopter at 9,000 feet over Table Mountain.

In 2009, Peters was a finalist on Celebrity Masterchef. Later that year, she toured Ireland with the one-woman play Mrs Whippy, written by Cecelia Ahern. Peters then toured the UK with Jenny Eclair and Susie Blake in Grumpy Old Women Live 2 – Chin Up Britain . The production returned for a season at the Novello Theatre in London's West End in 2010.

=== 2010–present: Return to the stage and Doctors ===
In 2010, Peters played the lead in Northern Broadsides' production of The Game by Harold Brighouse. The play had not been performed in 100 years and her performance garnered critical acclaim. Dominic Cavendish of The Daily Telegraph said, "Ma was played with hilarious gruffness and rolling pin obduracy by Wendi Peters. Her performance alone is worth the price of admission". Peters was described as "simply magnificent" by Michael Billington of The Guardian.

In 2011, Peters appeared at Hull Truck Theatre Company to play Bet in John Godber's two-hander, April in Paris. Peters again received acclaim from the press in the revival. A year later, she played Princess Puffer in Aria Entertainment's London revival of The Mystery of Edwin Drood, a musical comedy by Rupert Holmes, based on Charles Dickens' unfinished novel. The production ran at the Landor Theatre and transferred to the Arts Theatre for a limited run. In 2012, she appeared in an episode of Crime Stories as Marion Jackson. Then from November 2012 to January 2013, Peters starred in White Christmas at the Lowry at Salford Quays. In 2013, Jonathan Miller directed Githa Sowerby's Rutherford and Son in which Peters starred as Mrs Henderson to critical acclaim. Libby Purves of The Times said, "Wendi Peters has a fabulous cameo as a whining petitioner, unsentimentally illustrating the company's workforce challenges". Other press went on to add she was "unforgettable" and wrote that her scene was "formidable". She reprised the role at the Dominion Theatre in late 2014. Also in 2014, Peters reprised her role of Cilla in Coronation Street for a six-week stint.

Peters co-starred with Ian Reddington and Christopher Villiers in the 2015 production of Joan Littlewood's musical Oh, What a Lovely War!, directed by Terry Johnston, which toured nationally. Also that year, she played the lead role in the new play Hatched 'n' Dispatched at The Park Theatre, London. 2015 also marked her first appearance on the CBBC series Hetty Feather, a role she appeared in until 2017. In 2018, Peters took on the role of Cissy Robson in the UK tour of Quartet. Peters then starred in a UK tour of Salad Days in 2018, followed by a stint as Sylvie in the off-West End run of Call Me Vicky. She also appeared in Big The Musical for nine weeks.

In March 2021, she appeared in an episode of the BBC soap opera Doctors as Nicky Connelly. In 2022, Peters was the voiceover for the Channel 5 series Happy Campers: The Caravan Park. A year after her one-episode stint, it was announced that she would be joining the main cast of Doctors as Dr. Nina Bulsara. Peters began filming on the soap in October 2022 and began appearing onscreen from February 2023. She announced her exit from the series after 11 months in September 2023.

Peters returned to the stage starring as the Wicked Queen Carabosse in the Stockport Plaza's annual pantomime, Sleeping Beauty, for the winter 2024-25 season.

== Filmography ==
=== Film ===
Year	Title	Role	Notes
1996	In Love and War	Emily Rahn	
2004	Gyppo	Teacher	Short film
2008	Coronation Street: Out of Africa	Cilla Battersby-Brown	Direct-to-video film
2018	Mr. Sunshine	Sadie Bartholomew	Short film

=== Television ===
Year	Title	Role	Notes
1996	Cardiac Arrest	Ambulancewoman	Series 3; Episode 9: "The Age of Consent"
1996	Out of the Blue	Fay Marsh	Series 2; Episode 5: "Shooting Ducks"
2001	Bad Girls	Pam Jolly	Series 3; episodes 2 & 6: "The Turn of the Screw" and "Do or Die"
2003–2007, 2014	Coronation Street	Cilla Battersby-Brown	Regular role. 256 episodes
2004	Stars in Their Eyes	Herself / Kirsty MacColl	Soap Stars Special 3
2005	Coronation Street: Pantomime	Cilla Battersby-Brown	Television film
2006	Celebrity Mastermind	Herself - Contestant	Series 4; episode 4
2006	The Weakest Link	Herself - Contestant	Celebrities Couples Edition
2006	Celebrity Who Wants to Be a Millionaire?	Herself - Contestant	Series 19; episode 27
2006	Countdown	Herself - Dictionary Corner	Series 55; 10 episodes
2006	All Star Family Fortunes	Herself - Contestant	Series 1; episode 8: "Coronation Street vs. Emmerdale"
2006	Soapstar Superstar	Herself - Contestant	Series 1; episodes 1–5. 6th place
2009	Celebrity MasterChef	Herself - Contestant	Series 4; finalist
2012	Pointless Celebrities	Herself - Contestant	Series 3; episode 10: "Soap Stars"
2012	Crime Stories	Marion Jackson	Episode 1: "Care"
2012–2014	Britain's Best Bakery	Herself - Narrator	Series 1 & 2; 50 episodes
2013	Sadie J	Kelly	Series 3; episode 2: "Mamalicious"
2014	Hacker Time	Queen Shania	Recurring role. Series 4; episodes 1–5
2014	The BBC Children in Need Sewing Bee	Herself - Contestant	Children in Need Special; episode 1; winner
2015	Flockstars	Herself - Contestant	Episode 3
2015–2017	Hetty Feather	Cook Jenkins	Main role. Series 1–3; 10 episodes
2016	Pointless Celebrities	Herself - Contestant	Series 10; episode 15: "Christmas Special"
2019	Midsomer Murders	Lynda Babbage	Series 21; episode 3: "The Sting of Death"
2021	Doctors	Nicky Connelly	Series 22; episode 20: "Menpause"
2022	Happy Campers: The Caravan Park	Herself - Narrator	Series 2 & 3; 11 episodes
2023–2024	Doctors	Dr. Nina Bulsara	Regular role. Series 24; 96 episodes
2025	The Weakest Link	Herself - Contestant	Revival Series 4; Episode 9: "Doctors and Nurses Special"
2026	The Hairdresser Mysteries	Gloria Crudd	Series 1 - episode 2
