= The A Word =

British drama television series

- Title card
- Genre: Drama
- Based on: Yellow Peppers by Keren Margalit
- Developed by: Peter Bowker
- Written by: Peter Bowker
- Directed by: Peter Cattaneo (Series 1); Dominic Leclerc (Series 1); Susan Tully (Series 1–2); Luke Snellin (Series 2); Fergus O'Brien (director) John Hardwick (Series 3); Sasha Ransome (Series 3)
- Starring: Max Vento; Lee Ingleby; Morven Christie; Molly Wright; Greg McHugh; Vinette Robinson; Christopher Eccleston; Pooky Quesnel; David Gyasi; Julie Hesmondhalgh
- Composer: Rob Lane
- Country of origin: United Kingdom
- Original language: English
- No. of series: 3
- No. of episodes: 18

Production
- Executive producers: Lucy Ritcher (BBC); Patrick Spence (Fifty Fathoms); Peter Bowker (Fifty Fathoms); Marcus Wilson (Fifty Fathoms); Howard Burch (Keshett); Avi Nir (Keshet); Keren Margalit (Keshet); Sara Johnson (Keshet)
- Producers: Marcus Wilson (Series 1); Jenny Frayn (Series 2); Clare Shepherd (Series 3)
- Production locations: Lake District; Keswick, Cumbria; Thirlmere; Manchester; Space Studios Manchester
- Editor: Jamie Pearson
- Running time: 60 minutes
- Production companies: Keshet UK; Fifty Fathoms Productions

Original release
- Network: BBC One
- Release: 22 March 2016 – 9 June 2020

Related
- Yellow Peppers; Ralph & Katie

The A Word is a British television drama series, based on the Israeli series Yellow Peppers. The series follows a young boy and how his family cope with the revelation that he has autism spectrum disorder. Following filming in the Lake District from October 2015, a six-part series began airing on 22 March 2016. On 26 May 2016, the BBC announced that a second series of The A Word had been commissioned. It premiered in the UK on 7 November 2017. The third series began airing on 5 May 2020.

== Synopsis ==
Five-year-old Joe Hughes displays clear signs of communication problems and consistently isolates himself by listening to pop music through headphones. He has encyclopaedic knowledge of the songs he listens to and accurately sings along with the lyrics. His parents, Alison and Paul, seem oblivious to the disorder and wonder why Joe is ostracised by other children of the same age. However, it is later discovered by Joe's grandfather, Maurice, that Alison and Paul have been taking him to a hospital for his communication problems. Other family members know there is a problem; however, their attempts to intervene are met with obstruction from Joe's parents. After originally believing Joe had hearing problems, their ear, nose and throat consultant refers Joe to a specialist who diagnoses him with autism.

The story then follows how the dysfunctional family, including Joe's older half-sister Rebecca (who feels invisible), Eddie and Nicola (who are coping with their own relationship problems) and tactless grandad Maurice, cope with Joe's situation and their own apparent social disorders.

== Cast ==
Actor	Character	Role	Episode
Max Vento	Joe Hughes	a child on the autism spectrum	1–current
Lee Ingleby	Paul Hughes	Joe's father	1–current
Morven Christie	Alison Hughes	Joe's mother	1–current
Molly Wright	Rebecca Hughes	Joe's half-sister	1–current
Greg McHugh	Eddie Scott	Alison's brother	1–current
Vinette Robinson	Nicola Daniels	Eddie's wife	1–12
Christopher Eccleston	Maurice Scott	Joe's grandfather, Alison's and Eddie's father	1–current
Pooky Quesnel	Louise Wilson	Maurice's music teacher and lover	1–current
Leon Harrop	Ralph Wilson	Louise's son	1–current
Matt Greenwood	Tom Clarke	Rebecca's best friend	2–current
Thomas Gregory	Luke Taylor	Rebecca's boyfriend	2–6
Daniel Cerqueira	Dr Graves	Family doctor	1–current
George Bukhari	Terry Norris	Worker at Paul and Alison's cafe	1–current
Adam Wittek	David Nowak	Worker at the Scott's brewery	1–current
Tommie Grabiec	Pavel Kaminski	Worker at the Scott's brewery	1–current
Abby Ford	Sally	Worker at the Scott's brewery	4
Julia Krynke	Maya Petrenko	Joe's babysitter	2–5
Lisa Millett	Maggie White	Joe's speech therapist	3
Ralf Little	Stuart	Rebecca's biological father	5–6, 11, 14
Jude Akuwudike	Vincent Daniels	Nicola's father	7–current
Clare Holman	Grace Daniels	Nicola's mother	7–current
Aaron Pierre	James Thorne	Rebecca's boyfriend	7–8
Julie Hesmondhalgh	Heather	Joe's teacher	13–current
Krissi Bohn	Jean	Ralfs Social Worker	13, 16
Lucy Gaskell	Sophie Berwick	Worker at Paul's Gastropub	7–11
Travis Smith	Mark Berwick	Sophie's autistic teenage son	7–current
Sarah Gordy	Katie Thorne	Ralph's wife	13–current
Nigel Betts	Steve Thorne	Katie's father	13–current
Sherry Baines	Clare Thorne	Katie's mother	13–current
Austin Haynes	Olly Chapman	Joe's friend	7, 12

== Production ==
Bowker drew on his own experiences and observations as a teacher and with his family to write The A Word. Autism advocate Deborah Brownson served as an advisor on the production.

Filming took place from October 2015 at locations in the Lake District, including Keswick, Broughton-in-Furness, Coniston, Thirlmere Reservoir, and at The Space Project studios in Manchester.

On 24 May 2019, it was announced by the BBC, and then subsequently via press and social media publications, that a third series was in production. Returning cast members included Christopher Eccleston, Morven Christie, Lee Ingleby, Max Vento, Molly Wright, Greg McHugh, Pooky Quesnel, Matt Greenwood and Leon Harrop. Joining the cast as newcomers were Julie Hesmondhalgh, Sarah Gordy and David Gyasi.

== Episodes ==
=== Series overview ===
Series	Episodes	Originally released		Average UK viewers (millions)
Series	Episodes	First released	Last released	Average UK viewers (millions)
1	6	22 March 2016	26 April 2016	6.02
2	6	7 November 2017	12 December 2017	4.54
3	6	5 May 2020	9 June 2020	3.95

=== Series 1 (2016) ===
No. overall	No. in series	Title	Directed by	Written by	Original release date	UK viewers (millions)
1	1	"Episode 1"	Peter Cattaneo	Peter Bowker	22 March 2016	6.65
Alison and Paul continually make excuses for their five-year-old boy's uncooperative behaviour but will they listen to other family members who suspect something more serious? Meanwhile Nicola and Eddie move in next to Alison and Paul, hoping to make a new start in the Lakes, but will Eddie be able to forget Nicola's infidelity, especially as it has become public knowledge?
2	2	"Episode 2"	Peter Cattaneo	Peter Bowker	29 March 2016	6.13
Alison pulls Joe out of school and emotionally blackmails the rest of the family into home schooling. She also became dismissive of alternative ideas from Paul putting a strain on their marriage. Nicola and Eddie's relationship is also put to the test when Alison asks Nicola to seek a second opinion from her former fling Michael. All the while Rebecca is left to fend for herself and the only one who seems to care is her uncle Eddie.
3	3	"Episode 3"	Peter Cattaneo	Peter Bowker	5 April 2016	5.94
Speech therapist Maggie arrives and manages to make some progress with Joe whilst telling the family some home truths. She avoids speaking about her school history with Alison and abruptly halts her visits, ignoring Alison's pleas for her to stay. Does Maggie have a grudge to bear? Meanwhile Maurice reconsiders Louise's proposal, Nicola settles into her new job while Eddie struggles with his and Rebecca is feeling more and more ignored by her mother.
4	4	"Episode 4"	Dominic Leclerc	Peter Bowker	12 April 2016	5.85
Alison observes Joe playing with two other children and invites them for a sleepover during which Joe falls ill. While recovering Joe demonstrates empathy for his mother while they look at photos of his late grandmother, misleading Alison to believe he's cured of autism. Luke is ignoring Rebecca and she turns to Eddie and Nicola while Maurice realises he too misses his late wife more than he thought and perhaps his friends-with-benefits relationship with his music teacher wasn't such a good idea. Meanwhile, is Paul carrying a torch for an old flame?
5	5	"Episode 5"	Dominic Leclerc	Peter Bowker	19 April 2016	5.61
The police investigate Maya and discover she is an illegal immigrant. Despite Alison's desperate attempts to persuade family friend and police officer Bob to turn a blind eye, Maya is deported and Alison is worried for the effect it would have on Joe. Meanwhile Rebecca's relationship with Luke turns sour and Eddie's plans to move to Manchester are not popular with Nicola or Maurice.
6	6	"Episode 6"	Susan Tully	Peter Bowker	26 April 2016	5.94
After their fall out over differences of wanting more children Alison and Paul reconcile in time for the opening of their new restaurant. Maurice leaves Joe with Louise's son Ralph and Joe goes missing. As a mass search ensues, some uncomfortable truths are revealed.

=== Series 2 (2017) ===
No. overall	No. in series	Title	Directed by	Written by	Original release date	UK viewers (millions)
7	1	"Episode 1"	Susan Tully	Peter Bowker	7 November 2017	5.01
Alison and Paul worry over Joe when it becomes clear he is unhappy at school and he uses the word 'autistic' for the first time. Nicola and Eddie pretend to Nicola's parents that they are still together, but her parents have their own marital problems. Rebecca introduces the family to her new boyfriend James and Maurice gets the cold shoulder from Louise.
8	2	"Episode 2"	Susan Tully	Peter Bowker	14 November 2017	4.83
Joe starts his first day at the Pear Tree school, and Maurice employs Ralph at the brewery, much against the protests of Louise.
9	3	"Episode 3"	Susan Tully	Peter Bowker	21 November 2017	4.51
Paul takes Mark and Sophie to a gig. After the gig, he finds himself growing closer to Sophie. Meanwhile, Rebecca is heartbroken after James dumps her by text message. Alison meets Eddie's new girlfriend, Holly, who Alison thinks is almost exactly like Nicola. Maurice cares for Louise while she undergoes chemotherapy but she feels it is born out of his desire to "save" his late wife.
10	4	"Episode 4"	Luke Snellin	Peter Bowker	28 November 2017	4.30
In an attempt to patch up their relationship following the events of the previous episode, Rebecca arranges for Paul and Alison to spend the weekend at Eddie's flat in Manchester. Meanwhile, Maurice realises his feelings for Louise are stronger than he had previously thought.
11	5	"Episode 5"	Luke Snellin	Peter Bowker	5 December 2017	4.28
Paul is angered when Nicola uses a video of Joe in a speech about autism, and reveals to Alison he is less accepting of Joe's autism than he previously let on. Holly dumps Eddie, and Maurice proposes to Louise.
12	6	"Episode 6"	Luke Snellin	Peter Bowker	12 December 2017	4.30
Preparations begin for the end of year show at Joe's old primary school. Paul plans to leave Alison as he feels they are living "separate lives". Louise rejects Maurice's proposal and suggests they start a "clean slate". Maurice offers to step aside from the brewery and have Eddie run it without any interference. Eddie tells Nicola he is considering moving back home to run the brewery, but tells her that he only wants to be her "best friend" rather than her lover. During Joe's performance at the end of year show, he brings the family together on stage, but as he finishes, Maurice collapses.

=== Series 3 (2020) ===
No. overall	No. in series	Title	Directed by	Written by	Original release date	UK viewers (millions)
13	1	"Episode 1"	Fergus O'Brien	Peter Bowker	5 May 2020	4.23
14	2	"Episode 2"	Fergus O'Brien	Peter Bowker	12 May 2020	3.59
15	3	"Episode 3"	Fergus O'Brien	Peter Bowker	19 May 2020	3.32
16	4	"Episode 4"	John Hardwick	Peter Bowker	26 May 2020	3.79
17	5	"Episode 5"	Sasha Ransome	Peter Bowker	2 June 2020	4.08
18	6	"Episode 6"	John Hardwick	Peter Bowker	9 June 2020	4.73

== Release ==
BBC One began airing the first six-part series in a Tuesday 9pm slot, replacing Happy Valley, on 22 March 2016. SundanceTV acquired rights for broadcasting the show in America, and it premiered there on 13 July 2016. A second series began in the UK on 7 November 2017 remaining in its Tuesday 9pm slot. A third series was filmed in May 2019 and the entire series was released on BBC iPlayer on 5 May 2020. On the same day it also began broadcasting in its usual weekly slot on BBC One. BBC First airs the series in Australia. Disney+ picked up the programme for all three series across all of Europe, except the UK.

== Reception ==
=== Audience viewership ===
Overnight figures revealed the first episode was watched by 4.7 million viewers and had a 23% share of the audience. BARB later reported a consolidated figure of 5.91 million. Reaction to the first episode was mostly positive among viewers. Many people have praised the show on social media, partly for the quality of the acting but also for the way it dealt with the subject of autism.

=== Critical response ===
On review aggregator Rotten Tomatoes, the first series holds a 75% "Certified Fresh" score, based on 20 critics with an average rating of 5.9/10. The website's critics consensus reads, "The A Word overcomes an uneven start to offer a thoughtful, warm-hearted look at the engagingly messy lives of its protagonists – and a glimpse of challenges too rarely seen or discussed on television." On Metacritic, which uses a weighted average, the first season holds a score of 76/100 based on 12 critics, indicating "generally favorable reviews".

The second series holds a 93% "Fresh" score on Rotten Tomatoes, based on 14 critics with an average rating of 7.5/10. The website's critics consensus reads, "The A Word's second season expands its scope beyond the series' inciting diagnosis and blossoms into a thoughtful and warm view on the dynamics of family, while also candidly addressing the realities of raising a child with autism."

For the third series, 100% of nine critic reviews on Rotten Tomatoes gave the film a positive review, with an average rating of 8.2/10.

== Home media ==
Series 1 was released on DVD in September 2016, and series 2 in December 2017. The third series was released on DVD in July 2020.

== Spin-off ==
In August 2020 it was announced that a spin-off series Ralph & Katie, following the married life of the protagonists, had been commissioned by the BBC. The six-part series, which included a writing team made up predominantly of people with disabilities, was broadcast in October and November 2022, with all episodes available as a boxset on BBC iPlayer. The series will also be available on Disney+ in some regions.
