= Cilla Battersby-Brown =

Fictional character from Coronation Street

- Coronation Street character
- Portrayed by: Wendi Peters
- Duration: 2003–2007, 2014
- First appearance: Episode 5607; 20 October 2003
- Last appearance: Episode 8513; 14 November 2014
- Introduced by: Kieran Roberts (2003); Stuart Blackburn (2014)
- Spin-off appearances: Coronation Street: Out of Africa (2008)
In-universe information
- Occupation: Barmaid; Catering assistant Nurse
- Husband: Les Battersby (2005–2008)
- Sons: Billy Brown; Chesney Brown
- Daughters: Fiz Brown
- Stepdaughters: Leanne Battersby
- Grandsons: Joseph Brown; Aled Winter-Brown; Bryn Winter-Brown
- Granddaughters: Hope Dobbs; Carys Winter-Brown; Llio Winter-Brown

Cilla Battersby-Brown (also Brown) is a fictional character from the British ITV soap opera Coronation Street, played by Wendi Peters. She made her first appearance on 20 October 2003. After three years in the role, Peters announced her departure from the show in January 2007. Cilla made her on-screen exit on 12 October 2007. Peters later reprised the role for the feature-length episode Coronation Street: Out of Africa, in November 2008. This was produced on the condition that it would be only be available on DVD and would never be broadcast on TV. On 26 June 2014, it was announced that Peters would reprise the role of Cilla for a short stint. She returned for three weeks from 22 October to 14 November 2014.

Cilla was introduced as a love interest for established character Les Battersby (Bruce Jones), after his marriage to Janice Battersby (Vicky Entwistle) ended after nearly ten years. Cilla was also the mother of Chesney (Sam Aston), Fiz (Jennie McAlpine) and Billy Brown (Jay Martin). During her time on the show, Cilla pulled several scams and was disliked by most of her neighbours. She was diagnosed with skin cancer and later used her condition to get revenge on Les. Cilla left Weatherfield for Las Vegas in 2007, leaving her teenage son Chesney behind.

== Development ==
=== Casting ===
On 17 September 2003, it was announced that former Bad Girls actress Wendi Peters would be joining Coronation Street playing the character of Cilla Brown, mother of Fiz Brown (Jennie McAlpine) and a love interest for Les Battersby (Bruce Jones). A spokesperson told the Daily Mirror: "Les is like a born-again teenager with Cilla and becomes very defensive of her. He believes she is definitely the woman for him and acts the perfect gentleman with her in an effort to be a romantic. He starts to behave so unlike Les by opening doors for her and insisting they link arms whenever they are out together. But just when everything seems to be running smoothly there is a bolt from the blue."

=== Relationship with Les Battersby ===
In May 2004, it was announced that an upcoming storyline featuring Cilla marrying Les later in the year. A source for the News of the World revealed: "It all started as a joke at a boozy party after the British Soap Awards, but at the ideas meeting this week, the bosses realised what a great idea it was. Any scene with calls for Les and Cilla in wedding gear will be classic Corrie."

=== Departure ===
On 18 January 2007, Peters announced she would be leaving Coronation Street. On her decision to leave the role, Peters said "I've had a brilliant four years at Coronation Street. It's been filled with wonderful experiences and great opportunities. "I feel very privileged to have been given the fantastic character of Cilla and I shall really miss her. I'm looking forward to spending a bit more time with my families and pursuing and working on other projects." Producer Steve Frost said "Wendi is a valued member of the cast and she has made the character of Cilla one of the most colourful and memorable characters in soap history. We totally understand her reasons for wanting to leave and are grateful that she has given us so much notice – this means that we can spend time writing an exit storyline which will do her and the character of Cilla justice." Cilla made her final appearance on 12 October 2007. Peters later reprised the role for a DVD spin-off in November 2008.

=== Return ===
On 26 June 2014, it was announced Peters would reprise her role for six weeks. Her return storyline was not immediately revealed, but it will help to facilitate McAlpine's maternity leave. Peters commented "I'm really thrilled to have the opportunity to revisit Cilla and the cobbles for a short while and to see what she has been up to for the last 7 years." Cilla made her on-screen return on 22 October. It was later announced that Cilla would be hiding the fact that she has osteoporosis from her family.

== Storylines ==
Cilla meets Les Battersby (Bruce Jones) in the Weatherfield Arms, where she works as a barmaid. When Cilla comes face to face with Fiz Brown (Jennie McAlpine), it emerges that they are mother and daughter. Cilla also reveals that she has left her young son Chesney (Sam Aston) at home alone, while she is out having fun with her new man. When Rita Sullivan (Barbara Knox) hits Chesney for stealing from her shop, Cilla uses it as an opportunity to claim compensation. She has Rita arrested and prosecuted for assaulting Chesney. Rita spends a night in jail for contempt of court and Cilla receives £500 in compensation and £500 in damages. However, she demands more from Rita and threatens to sue her in a civil court. Eventually, Cilla drops the case. When Janice Battersby (Vicky Entwistle) finds out that Cilla and Les are dating, the two women begin arguing; which leads to a fight. Cilla and Chesney move in with Les and Fiz. Les buys them a large bathtub, but when Chesney's dog Schmeichel decides to join them, it crashes through the floor, due to the extra weight. The next day, Norris Cole (Malcolm Hebden), tries to report the bath incident to the council.

Les and Cilla plan to marry just to get wedding presents from everyone. When Les' favourite band Status Quo show up in Weatherfield, Cilla sees another way to make quick money when the band attacks Les for ruining a concert twenty years earlier. Cilla demands compensation from the band unless they perform at her reception. The band agree to perform, which angers Cilla as she wanted the money. On the day of the wedding, Cilla has a run-in with Tracy Barlow (Kate Ford), as she has not paid for her wedding bouquet. Cilla and Les marry. At the reception, The Quo are in a back room where the presents were being kept, when Les walks in and tells them that he has always wanted to trash a room full of expensive things. He duly wrecks everything and throws a television out the window, only for Cilla to walk in and inform him that he had just trashed their wedding presents. Cilla attacks Les, before they join The Quo on stage.

Cilla throws Les out after he admits to having slept with Janice. Cilla is hurt at what Les has done, and starts wearing basic clothes and no make-up. When Les says he will crawl across the cobbles in order to win Cilla over, Cilla can not let Les go through with it, and they reconcile. Cilla tells Fiz that she has skin cancer. On finding out that Les has had an affair with her best friend, Yana Lumb; Cilla decides to get revenge. She tells everyone that her cancer is terminal, leading the Street's residents to make a collection to send Cilla to Florida, so she can swim with dolphins. Les and Yana sit in a bath full of mushy peas, raising £600. Cilla admits that she lied about the cancer, leaving the family devastated. Cilla travels to Florida alone, leaving Les to apologise to their friends and neighbours.

When Cilla returns, she slaps Yana and reunites with Les. A few months later, Les leaves to work as a roadie for a tribute band called "ZZ Top O' The Mornin'", and Cilla is sacked from her job at Wong's Chippy; where she blames Jodie Morton (Samantha Seager). Cilla struggles financially and takes a job at a nursing home, where she meets a wealthy man, Frank Nicholls (Keith Clifford). Frank is a perfect match for Cilla, as he is just as ruthless as she is. Frank tells Cilla that he needs a full-time carer and he invites Cilla to go with him to Las Vegas. When Frank dies, Cilla believes that she will inherit everything, but is disappointed when she is left just £500 in Frank's will. Cilla decides to sell a necklace that Frank had given her, and is surprised to learn that it is worth £45,000. Cilla then decides to leave the country. Chesney, Fiz and Kirk later visit Cilla in South Africa, leading to the events of "Out of Africa".

In October 2014, Cilla returns to the street to visit Fiz and Chesney. It is revealed that she is now living in Wolverhampton. She later reveals to Sinead Tinker (Katie McGlynn), Chesney's girlfriend, that she is suffering from osteoporosis, and she swears her to secrecy. Her family aren't too pleased to see her when she arrives, as they believe that she is up to something due to her mischievous past. She later leaves the street on the bus, but once Fiz and Chesney find out about their mother's illness from Sinead they later try to find her, invite her back and apologise but by that point, she had already gone.

== See also ==
- List of soap opera villains
