= Sarah Gordy =

British actress (born 1976)

Sarah Gordy MBE
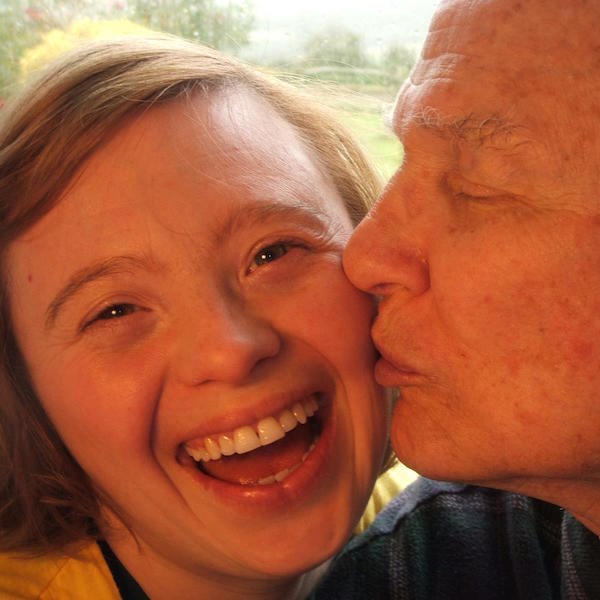
- Sarah Gordy with her father (2016)
- Born: September 1976 (age 50); London, England
- Occupation: Actress
- Years active: 2000–present
- Known for: Her acting in television and theatre; being made an MBE and becoming the first woman with Down syndrome to receive an honorary degree from a UK university.
- Notable work: Strike: The Silkworm; Upstairs Downstairs; The A Word
- Website: sarahgordy.com

Sarah Gordy, MBE (born September 1976) is a British actress who has Down syndrome. She is best known for her roles as Katie Thorne in The A Word and Ralph & Katie, Orlando Quine in Strike: The Silkworm, Lady Pamela Holland in the BBC TV series of Upstairs Downstairs, and Lucy Craddle in The Long Call. She has also acted in episodes of Call the Midwife, Holby City and Doctors. As well as these TV shows, she has acted in short films, radio dramas, commercials, and many theatre productions. In 2018 she was awarded an MBE for services to the arts and people with disabilities and became the first person with Down syndrome to receive an honorary degree from a UK university, receiving it from the University of Nottingham.

== Career ==
Gordy gained her first professional acting job on the ITV television series, Peak Practice, as Jessica Bain in "Walls of Jericho" (Series 10, Episode 11). She subsequently landed many other TV and theatre roles.

In summer 2010, Gordy found out she had been chosen for the role of Lady Pamela Holland in the new BBC One production of Upstairs Downstairs. Lady Pamela was the long-lost sister of the lead character, Sir Hallam. Part of her role was written to illustrate the 1930s attitudes to disabilities. Her character was introduced in the third episode of the three-part drama. Lady Pamela became a regular character in the second series, which was televised in February 2012.

Gordy starred in episode #3.5 of Call the Midwife, which was first broadcast on BBC One on 16 February 2014. She played Sally Harper, a young woman with Down syndrome who became pregnant from her relationship with Jacob Milligan, a young man with cerebral palsy, played by Colin Young. Written by series creator, Heidi Thomas, the episode highlighted the treatment of people with physical and intellectual disabilities in British society in the late 1950s.

Gordy has read four "Bedtime Stories" for CBeebies and acting in the BBC Radio 4 play, Resurrection, in April 2012.

In 2012, Gordy starred in the short film TimeSlip, written and directed by Suchi Chatterjee. It was made with the support of the Oyster Project in Lewes. It won the Our Story award in the Oska Bright Film Festival 2013. It also won the Our Story Class in the Australian 2014 Sit Down Shut Up & Watch (SDSW) Festival and was short-listed for the Picture This Film Festival in Calgary, Canada. Gordy co-directed and played Mary in "The Infant King" for the Oyster Project.

In 2013, Gordy won a BBC Sussex and Surrey Community Heroes Award. She was given the Arts Award in Lewes Town Council's Civic Awards in 2014 for service to the people of Lewes and her work in the Arts, especially for disabled people living and working in Lewes.

Gordy broke new ground in 2014 by playing a central character without a disability in the play Crocodiles at Manchester's Royal Exchange Theatre. She has done a lot of theatre work, appearing in Once We were Mothers by Lisa Evans for the New Vic, Newcastle-under-Lyme, and in its second production at The Orange Tree Theatre, Richmond. She co-starred in the two-person play Into the Blue at The Arcola Theatre, London. She played the leading role in a touring theatre production, Seize the Day, with Hijinx Theatre, and has also toured with The Theatre Centre and Kazzum Theatre.

Gordy is one of the principal dancers for Culture Device Dance Project, an experimental dance company for professional dancers with Down syndrome. She has performed in Germany, Macedonia, UK and Ireland. She performed a series of dance pieces at the My Perspective International Photography Competition Awards Ceremony in June 2016 which is held each year by the Down's Syndrome Association (DSA).

Gordy has also done a lot of modelling work. She is one of the models in the ongoing Radical Beauty Project, which seeks to change the way we see Down's Syndrome. She was photographed by Rankin as part of Mencap #HereIAm campaign. She worked with Richard Bailey on his award-winning After Vermeer series for Shifting Perspectives for the DSA.

In 2017, Gordy portrayed Orlando Quine in two episodes of Strike: The Silkworm

In November 2018, Gordy was presented with an MBE for services to the arts and people with disabilities. The MBE had been awarded as part of the Queen's Birthday Honours in June. The following month, she received an honorary Doctor of Law degree from the University of Nottingham, becoming the first person with Down's Syndrome to be awarded an honorary degree by a British university.

Gordy starred in Jellyfish, a new play written by Ben Weatherill, which premiered at the Bush Theatre in June 2018. Following a sold-out run at the Bush, it moved to the National Theatre in July 2019. Gordy was nominated for Best West End Debut in The Stage Debut Awards 2019.

In March 2019, Gordy performed "The Rite Re-evisioned" with Culture Device Dance Project and dancers of The Royal Ballet at the Royal Opera House. Culture Device performed the dance again for the film The Rite, which was nominated for Fashion Film Award.

In 2019, Gordy joined the cast of The A Word, as Katie, in the third season of the BBC drama series. This aired in May 2020 with Ralph and Katie's storyline building up to their wedding and moving in together. In August 2020 the BBC announced that the characters would get their own spin-off series, which aired in 2022.

In 2020 writer Saba Salman put together a book with contributions from leading people with learning disabilities. "Made Possible: Stories of success by people with disabilities – in their own words" included contributions from the artist Laura Broughton, the singer Lizzie Emeh and Gordy.

== Personal life ==
Gordy has a younger sister, Catherine. Their mother, Jane Gordy, acts as Sarah's drama coach, travelling with her and helping with her lines.

Gordy lives in Lewes, East Sussex. She enjoys dancing and working out. When she is not acting, she regularly volunteers at the local British Heart Foundation charity shop.

Gordy is a celebrity ambassador for Mencap and Patron of Circus Starr. In 2019, she became Patron of the Cutting Edge Theatre Company in Scotland.
