= 24th Golden Raspberry Awards =

Award ceremony presented by the Golden Raspberry Award Foundation in 2003

- Date: February 28, 2004
- Site: Sheraton Hotel, Santa Monica, California

Highlights
- Worst Picture: Gigli
- Most awards: Gigli (6)
- Most nominations: Gigli (9)

The 24th Golden Raspberry Awards, or Razzies, were held on February 28, 2004, at the Sheraton Hotel in Santa Monica, California, to honor the worst films the film industry had to offer in 2003.

Late summer box office flop Gigli led the pack, receiving nine nominations and becoming the first film to sweep the six major categories (Worst Picture, Director, Actor, Actress, Screenplay, and Screen Couple). Tied for second most-nominated, with eight each, were the Mike Myers holiday film The Cat in the Hat and From Justin to Kelly, a remake of Where the Boys Are inspired by the television series American Idol.

As with Bill Cosby on the 8th Golden Raspberry Awards and Tom Selleck on the 13th Golden Raspberry Awards, respectively, Ben Affleck did not attend the ceremony, but was quoted by the Associated Press as saying that he felt "stiffed" by the Golden Raspberry Awards committee, who did not send the prize out to him. Razzies founder John Wilson delivered the trophy to the studios of Larry King Live but Affleck was unimpressed and left it behind. Wilson retrieved the trophy and auctioned it on eBay. The trophy sold for $1700 which Wilson used to pay for the Ivar Theater for the 25th Golden Raspberry Awards the next year. Affleck went on to win the first Razzie Reedemer Award in 2014.

== Winners and nominees ==
Winner (in bold)

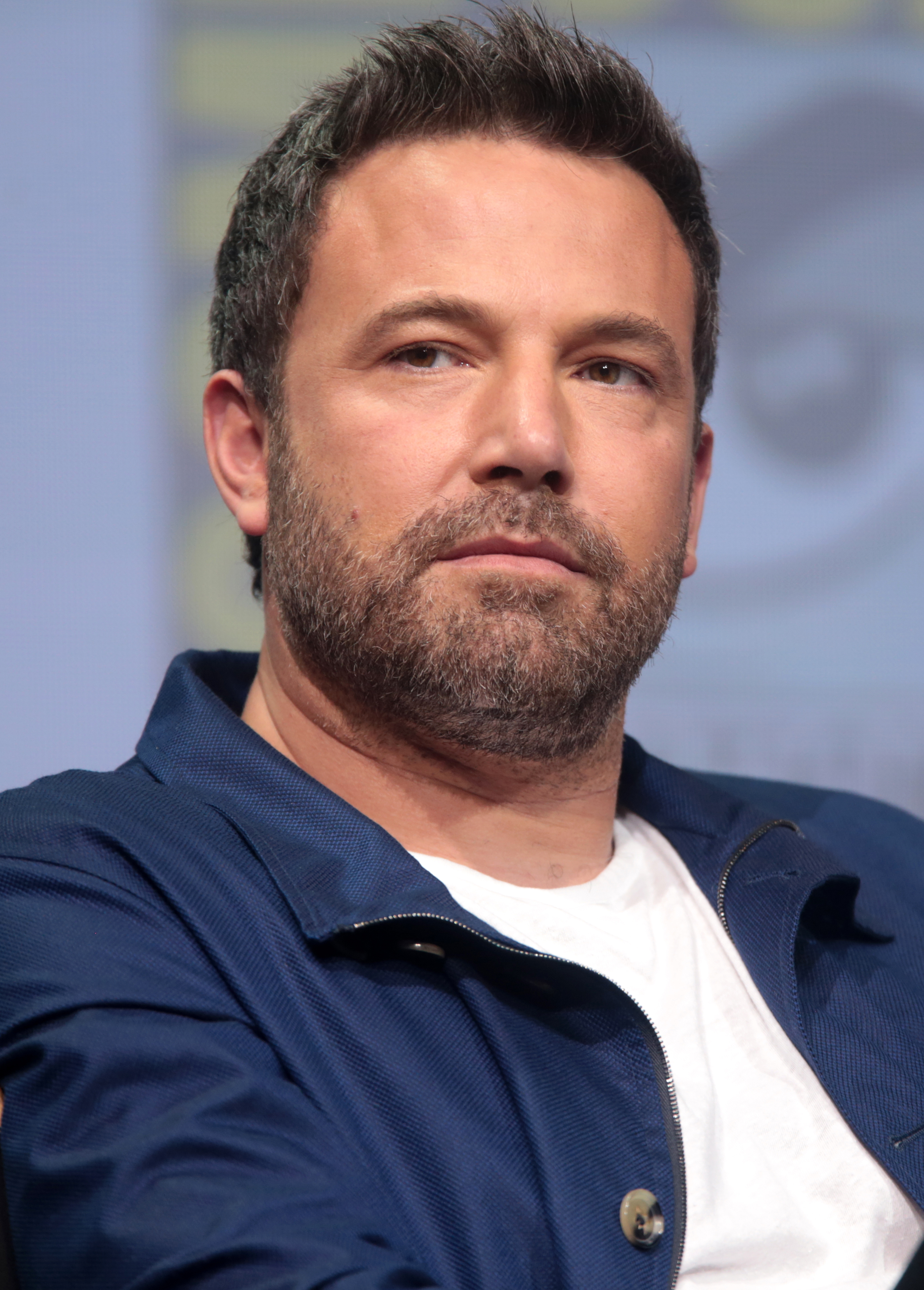
Ben Affleck, Worst Actor winner and Worst Screen Couple co-winner

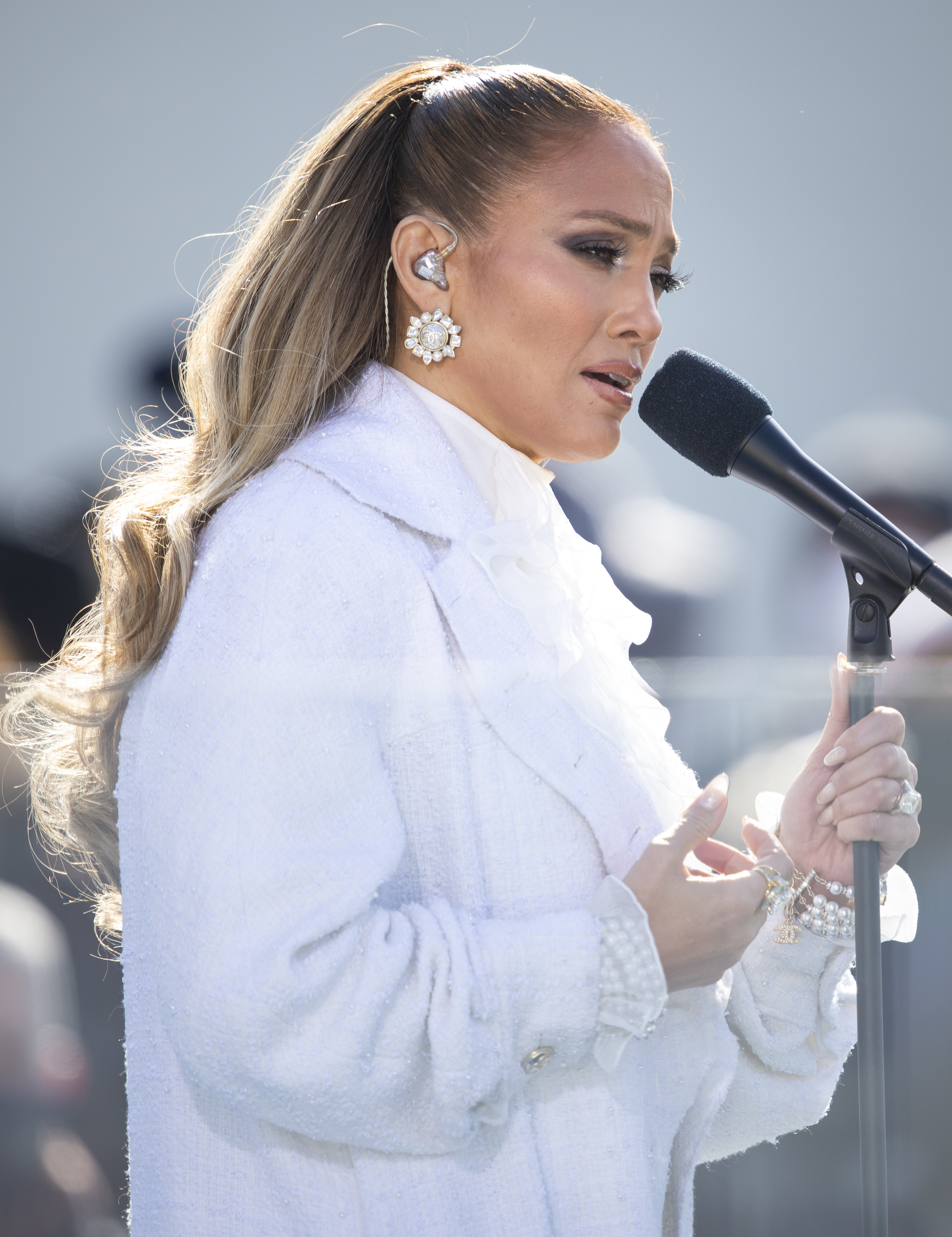
Jennifer Lopez, Worst Actress winner and Worst Screen Couple co-winner

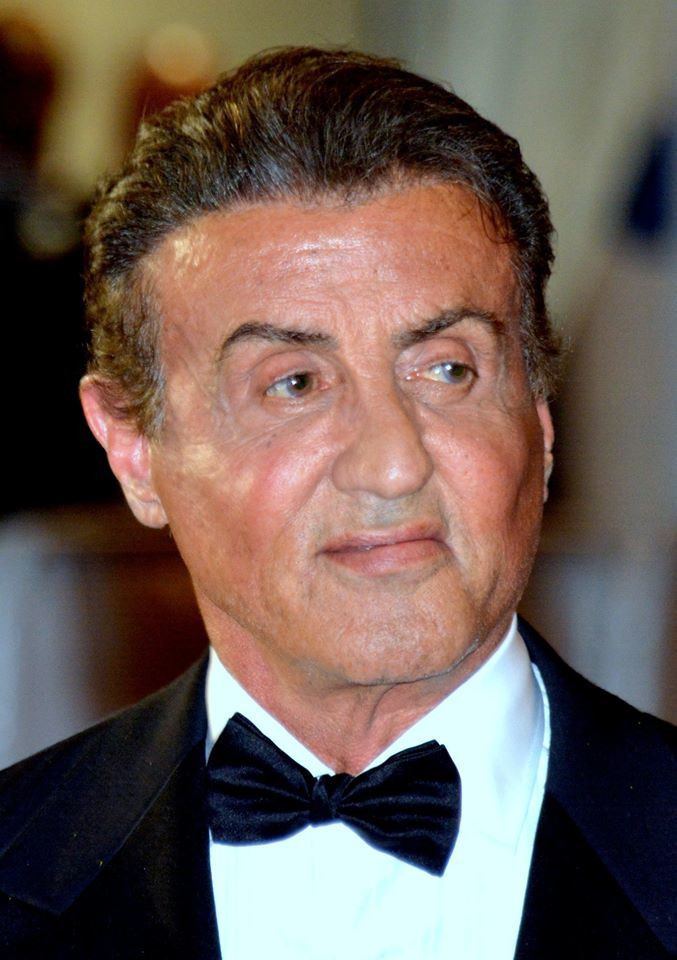
Sylvester Stallone, Worst Supporting Actor winner

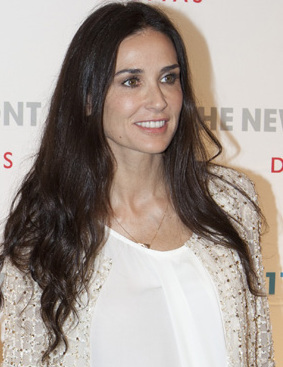
Demi Moore, Worst Supporting Actress winner

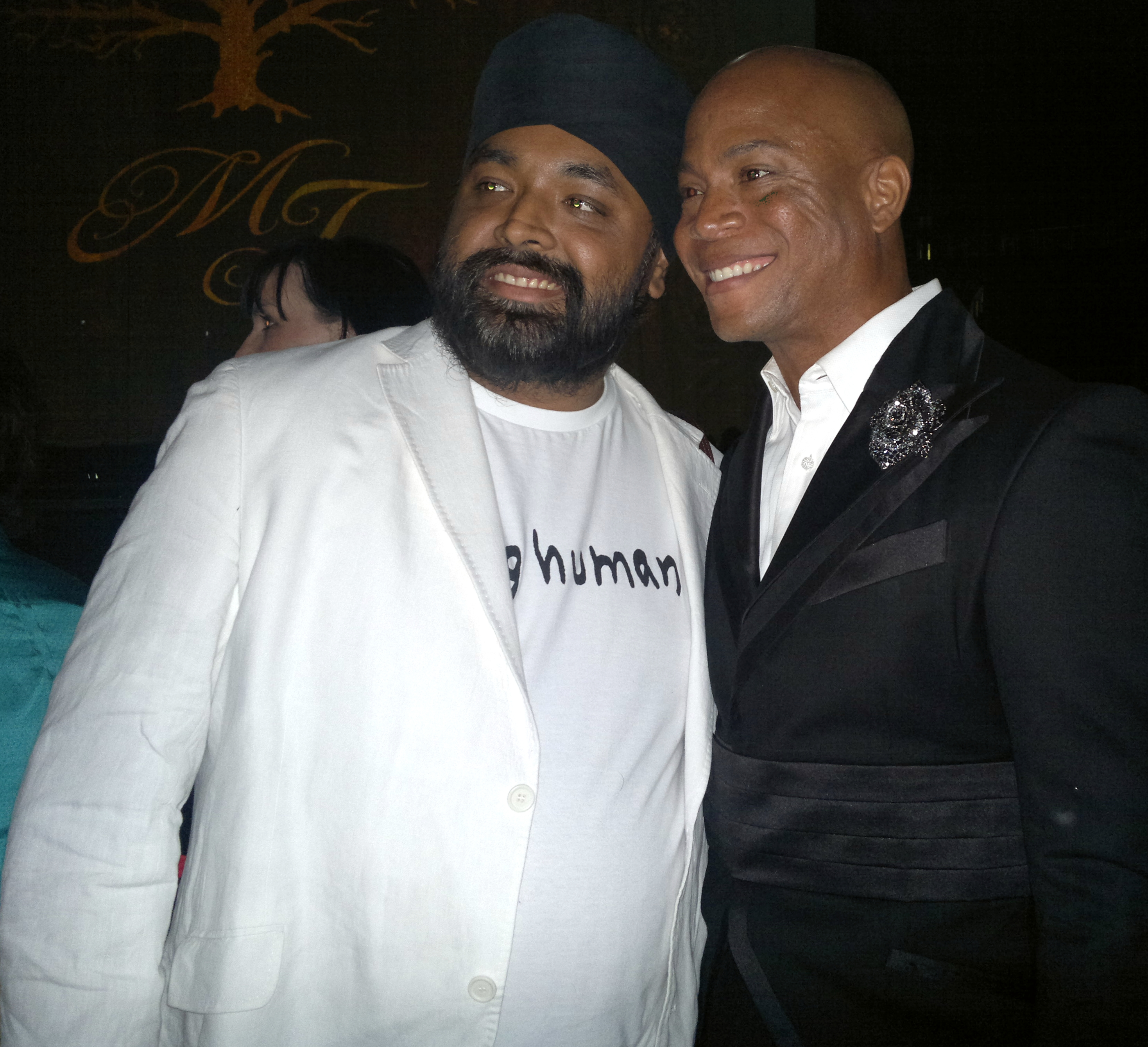
Travis Payne, Governor's Award for Distinguished Under-Achievement in Choreography winner

Category	Recipient
Worst Picture	**Gigli (Columbia/Revolution Studios)**
Worst Picture	The Cat in the Hat (Universal/DreamWorks)
Worst Picture	Charlie's Angels: Full Throttle (Columbia)
Worst Picture	From Justin to Kelly (Fox)
Worst Picture	The Real Cancun (New Line Cinema)
Worst Actor	**Ben Affleck in Daredevil, Gigli, and Paycheck as Matt Murdock/Daredevil, Larry Gigli and Michael Jennings (respectively)**
Worst Actor	Cuba Gooding, Jr. in Boat Trip, The Fighting Temptations, and Radio as Jerry Robinson, Darrin Hill and James Robert "Radio" Kennedy (respectively)
Worst Actor	Justin Guarini in From Justin to Kelly as Justin Bell
Worst Actor	Ashton Kutcher in Cheaper by the Dozen, Just Married, and My Boss's Daughter as Hank, Tom Leezak and Tom Stansfield (respectively)
Worst Actor	Mike Myers in The Cat in the Hat as The Cat in the Hat
Worst Actress	**Jennifer Lopez in Gigli as Ricki**
Worst Actress	Drew Barrymore in Charlie's Angels: Full Throttle and Duplex as Dylan Sanders and Nancy Kendricks (respectively)
Worst Actress	Kelly Clarkson in From Justin to Kelly as Kelly Taylor
Worst Actress	Cameron Diaz in Charlie's Angels: Full Throttle as Natalie Cook
Worst Actress	Angelina Jolie in Beyond Borders and Lara Croft: Tomb Raider – The Cradle of Life as Sarah Jordan and Lara Croft (respectively)
Worst Supporting Actor	**Sylvester Stallone in Spy Kids 3-D: Game Over as The Toymaker**
Worst Supporting Actor	Anthony Anderson in Kangaroo Jack as Louis Booker
Worst Supporting Actor	Alec Baldwin in The Cat in the Hat as Larry Quinn
Worst Supporting Actor	Al Pacino in Gigli as Starkman
Worst Supporting Actor	Christopher Walken in Gigli and Kangaroo Jack as Det. Stanley Jacobellis and Salvatore Maggio (respectively)
Worst Supporting Actress	**Demi Moore in Charlie's Angels: Full Throttle as Madison Lee**
Worst Supporting Actress	Lainie Kazan in Gigli as Mrs. Gigli
Worst Supporting Actress	Brittany Murphy in Just Married as Sarah Leezak
Worst Supporting Actress	Kelly Preston in The Cat in the Hat as Joan Walden
Worst Supporting Actress	Tara Reid in My Boss's Daughter as Lisa Taylor
Worst Screen Couple	**Ben Affleck and Jennifer Lopez in Gigli**
Worst Screen Couple	Kelly Clarkson and Justin Guarini in From Justin to Kelly
Worst Screen Couple	Ashton Kutcher and either Brittany Murphy in Just Married or Tara Reid in My Boss's Daughter
Worst Screen Couple	Mike Myers and either Thing One or Thing Two (both voiced by Dan Castellaneta) in The Cat in the Hat
Worst Screen Couple	Eric Christian Olsen and Derek Richardson in Dumb and Dumberer: When Harry Met Lloyd
Worst Remake or Sequel	**Charlie's Angels: Full Throttle (Columbia)**
Worst Remake or Sequel	Dumb and Dumberer: When Harry Met Lloyd (New Line Cinema)
Worst Remake or Sequel	From Justin to Kelly (Fox) (remake of both Where the Boys Are and Where the Boys Are '84)
Worst Remake or Sequel	The Texas Chainsaw Massacre (New Line Cinema)
Worst Remake or Sequel	2 Fast 2 Furious (Universal)
Worst Director	**Martin Brest for Gigli**
Worst Director	Robert Iscove for From Justin to Kelly
Worst Director	Mort Nathan for Boat Trip
Worst Director	The Wachowskis for The Matrix Reloaded and The Matrix Revolutions
Worst Director	Bo Welch for The Cat in the Hat
Worst Screenplay	**Gigli, written by Martin Brest**
Worst Screenplay	The Cat in the Hat, screenplay by Alec Berg, David Mandel & Jeff Schaffer, based on the book by Dr. Seuss
Worst Screenplay	Charlie's Angels: Full Throttle, screenplay by John August and Marianne Wibberley & Cormac Wibberley, based on the TV series created by Ivan Goff and Ben Roberts
Worst Screenplay	Dumb and Dumberer: When Harry Met Lloyd, screenplay by Robert Brener and Troy Miller
Worst Screenplay	From Justin to Kelly, written by Kim Fuller
Worst Excuse for an Actual Movie (All Concept/No Content)	**The Cat in the Hat (Universal/DreamWorks)**
Worst Excuse for an Actual Movie (All Concept/No Content)	Charlie's Angels: Full Throttle (Columbia)
Worst Excuse for an Actual Movie (All Concept/No Content)	From Justin to Kelly (Fox)
Worst Excuse for an Actual Movie (All Concept/No Content)	The Real Cancun (New Line Cinema)
Worst Excuse for an Actual Movie (All Concept/No Content)	2 Fast 2 Furious (Universal)
Governor's Award for Distinguished Under-Achievement in Choreography	**Travis Payne for his work on From Justin to Kelly**

== Films with multiple nominations ==
These films received multiple nominations:

Nominations	Films
9	Gigli
8	The Cat in the Hat
8	From Justin to Kelly
7	Charlie's Angels: Full Throttle
3	Dumb and Dumberer: When Harry Met Lloyd
3	Just Married
3	My Boss's Daughter
2	Boat Trip
2	Kangaroo Jack
2	The Real Cancun
2	2 Fast 2 Furious

== See also ==
- 2003 in film
- 76th Academy Awards
- 57th British Academy Film Awards
- 61st Golden Globe Awards
- 10th Screen Actors Guild Awards
