= 2003 Stinkers Bad Movie Awards =

Award ceremony presented by the Stinkers Bad Movie Awards in 2006

26th Stinkers Bad Movie Awards
- Date: February 22, 2004

Highlights
- Worst Film: The Cat in the Hat
- Most awards: Gigli (5)
- Most nominations: The Cat in the Hat (12)

The 26th Stinkers Bad Movie Awards were released by the Hastings Bad Cinema Society on February 22, 2004, to honour the worst films the film industry had to offer in 2003. The Cat in the Hat received the most nominations with twelve, the most nominations in the awards' history. All nominees and winners, with respective percentages of votes for each category, are listed below. Dishonourable mentions are also featured for Worst Picture (56 total).

== Winners and nominees ==
=== Worst Film ===
Film	Percentage of votes
The Cat in the Hat (Universal)	41%
Boat Trip (Artisan)	3%
Dumb and Dumberer: When Harry Met Lloyd (New Line)	11%
From Justin to Kelly (FOX)	26%
Gigli (Columbia)	19%

==== Dishonourable mentions ====
- Alex & Emma (Warner Bros.)
- Anger Management (Columbia)
- Bad Boys II (Columbia)
- Basic (Columbia)
- Beyond Borders (Paramount)
- Biker Boyz (DreamWorks)
- Bubba Ho-Tep (Vitagraph)
- Bulletproof Monk (MGM)
- Charlie's Angels: Full Throttle (Columbia)
- Chasing Papi (FOX)
- The Core (Paramount)
- Daddy Day Care (Columbia)
- Daredevil (FOX)
- Dreamcatcher (Warner Bros.)
- Duplex (Miramax)
- Elephant (Fine Line)
- Freddy vs. Jason (New Line)
- Gerry (ThinkFilm)
- Gods and Generals (Warner Bros.)
- Grind (Warner Bros.)
- The Guru (Universal)
- Head of State (DreamWorks)
- House of 1000 Corpses (Lionsgate)
- House of the Dead (Artisan)
- How to Lose a Guy in 10 Days (Paramount)
- Hulk (Universal)
- The Hunted (Paramount)
- In the Cut (Screen Gems)
- The In-Laws (Warner Bros.)
- Irréversible (Lionsgate)
- It Runs in the Family (MGM)
- Kangaroo Jack (Warner Bros.)
- Lara Croft: Tomb Raider – The Cradle of Life (Paramount)
- The League of Extraordinary Gentlemen (FOX)
- Legally Blonde 2: Red, White & Blonde (MGM)
- The Life of David Gale (Universal)
- A Man Apart (New Line)
- Marci X (Paramount)
- Masked and Anonymous (Sony Pictures Classics)
- The Matrix Reloaded (Warner Bros.)
- The Matrix Revolutions (Warner Bros.)
- The Medallion (TriStar)
- My Boss's Daughter (Dimension)
- National Security (Columbia)
- People I Know (Miramax)
- The Real Cancun (New Line)
- Scary Movie 3 (Dimension)
- Spy Kids 3-D: Game Over (Dimension)
- The Texas Chainsaw Massacre (New Line)
- 21 Grams (Focus)
- Uptown Girls (MGM)
- View from the Top (Miramax)
- What a Girl Wants (Warner Bros.)
- Wonderland (Lionsgate)
- Wrong Turn (FOX)
- X2 (FOX)

=== Worst Director ===
Recipient	Percentage of votes
McG for Charlie's Angels: Full Throttle	30%
Richard Benjamin for Marci X	10%
Martin Brest for Gigli	26%
Robert Iscove for From Justin to Kelly	15%
Bo Welch for The Cat in the Hat	19%

=== Worst Actor ===
Recipient	Percentage of votes
Ben Affleck in Daredevil, Paycheck, and Gigli	33%
Macaulay Culkin in Party Monster	7%
Cuba Gooding, Jr. in Boat Trip, The Fighting Temptations, and Radio	15%
Justin Guarini in From Justin to Kelly	26%
Mike Myers in The Cat in the Hat	19%

=== Worst Actress ===
Recipient	Percentage of votes
Jennifer Lopez in Gigli	48%
Drew Barrymore in Charlie's Angels: Full Throttle and Duplex	15%
Kelly Clarkson in From Justin to Kelly	19%
Kate Hudson in Alex & Emma and How to Lose a Guy in 10 Days	15%
Lisa Kudrow in Marci X	3%

=== Worst Supporting Actor ===
Recipient	Percentage of votes
Sylvester Stallone in Spy Kids 3D: Game Over	52%
Alec Baldwin in The Cat in the Hat	3%
Justin Bartha in Gigli	27%
John Malkovich in Johnny English	7%
Roger Moore in Boat Trip	22%

=== Worst Supporting Actress ===
Recipient	Percentage of votes
Penelope Cruz in Gothika and Masked and Anonymous	26%
Karen Black in House of 1000 Corpses	22%
Robin Givens in Head of State	19%
Lainie Kazan in Gigli	22%
Estella Warren in Kangaroo Jack	11%

=== Worst Screenplay for a Film Grossing More Than $100M Worldwide Using Hollywood Math ===
Recipient	Percentage of votes
The Cat in the Hat (Universal), written by Alec Berg, David Mandel, and Jeff Schaffer	52%
Charlie's Angels: Full Throttle (Columbia), written by John August, Cormac Wibberley, and Marianne Wibberley	19%
Legally Blonde 2: Red, White and Blonde (MGM), written by Kate Kondell	10%
The Matrix Reloaded and The Matrix Revolutions (Warner Bros.), written by The Wachowskis	19%
Scary Movie 3 (Dimension), written by Craig Mazin and Pat Proft	0%

=== Most Painfully Unfunny Comedy ===
Recipient	Percentage of votes
Boat Trip (Artisan)	40%
The Cat in the Hat (Universal)	28%
Dumb and Dumberer: When Harry Met Lloyd (New Line)	24%
Kangaroo Jack (Warner Bros.)	0%
Scary Movie 3 (Dimension)	3%

=== Worst Song or Song Performance in a Film or Its End Credits ===
Recipient	Percentage of votes
"Anytime" by Kelly Clarkson and Justin Guarini from From Justin to Kelly	33%
"Baby Got Back" by Justin Bartha from Gigli	30%
"Cross the Green Mountain" by Bob Dylan from Gods and Generals	7%
"Fun, Fun, Fun" by Mike Myers from The Cat in the Hat	22%
"Power in My Purse" by Lisa Kudrow from Marci X	8%

=== Most Intrusive Musical Score ===
Recipient	Percentage of votes
Charlie's Angels: Full Throttle (Columbia)	41%
Bad Boys 2 (Columbia)	15%
House of 1000 Corpses (Lionsgate)	15%
Gigli (Columbia)	10%
The League of Extraordinary Gentlemen (FOX)	19%

=== Worst On-Screen Couple ===
Recipient	Percentage of votes
Ben Affleck and Jennifer Lopez in Gigli	33%
Kelly Clarkson and Justin Guarini in From Justin to Kelly	30%
Cuba Gooding, Jr. and anyone forced to co-star with him in Boat Trip, The Fighting Temptations, and Radio	15%
Lisa Kudrow and Damon Wayans in Marci X	7%
Stephen Lang and 5-Year-Old Lydia Jordan, YIKES!!! in Gods and Generals	15%

=== Most Annoying Fake Accent (Male) ===
Recipient	Percentage of votes
Ben Affleck in Gigli	41%
Walton Goggins in House of 1000 Corpses	7%
John Malkovich in Johnny English	7%
Mike Myers in The Cat in the Hat	26%
John Travolta in Basic	19%

=== Most Annoying Fake Accent (Female) ===
Recipient	Percentage of votes
Jennifer Lopez in Gigli	26%
Karen Black in House of 1000 Corpses	19%
Kelly Clarkson in From Justin to Kelly	14%
Kate Hudson in Alex & Emma	19%
Connie Nielsen in Basic	22%

=== Worst Sequel ===
Recipient	Percentage of votes
Bad Boys 2 (Columbia)	26%
Charlie's Angels: Full Throttle (Columbia)	22%
Legally Blonde 2: Red, White and Blonde (MGM)	20%
The Matrix Reloaded and The Matrix Revolutions (Warner Bros.)	13%
Spy Kids 3D: Game Over (Dimension)	19%

=== The Spencer Breslin Award (for Worst Performance by a Child in a Feature Role) ===
Recipient	Percentage of votes
Spencer Breslin in The Cat in the Hat	N/A
Dakota Fanning in The Cat in the Hat and Uptown Girls	N/A
Lydia Jordan in Gods and Generals	N/A
Frankie Muniz in Agent Cody Banks	N/A
Daryl Sabara in Spy Kids 3-D: Game Over	N/A

- Note: only Stinkers founders Mike Lancaster and Ray Wright were allowed to pick the winner here, which is why no percentages are listed.

=== Least "Special" Special Effects ===
Recipient	Percentage of votes
Hulk (Universal)	41%
Charlie's Angels: Full Throttle (Columbia)	19%
Kangaroo Jack (Warner Bros.)	14%
The League of Extraordinary Gentlemen (FOX)	26%
Spy Kids 3D: Game Over (Dimension)	0%

=== Worst On-Screen Group ===
Recipient	Percentage of votes
The Post-Teen Alcoholics in The Real Cancun	33%
The Angels in Charlie's Angels: Full Throttle	15%
The League of the Hopelessly Miscast in The League of Extraordinary Gentlemen	11%
The Pennsylvania Posse in From Justin to Kelly	15%
Sylvester Stallone and his multiple personalities in Spy Kids 3D: Game Over	19%

=== Most Annoying Non-Human Character ===
Recipient	Percentage of votes
The Cat in the Hat played by Mike Myers in The Cat in the Hat	48%
The Hulk in Hulk	19%
Kangaroo Jack in Kangaroo Jack	22%
Thing 1 & Thing 2 played by Dan Castellaneta in The Cat in the Hat	4%
Tink played by Ludivine Sagnier in Peter Pan	7%

=== Most Overrated Movie ===
Recipient	Percentage of votes
The Last Samurai (Warner Bros.)	31%
Big Fish (Columbia)	7%
Kill Bill: Vol 1 (Miramax)	23%
The Lord of the Rings: The Return of the King (New Line)	12%
Lost in Translation (Focus)	27%

== Films with multiple wins and nominations ==
The following films received multiple nominations:

Nominations	Film
12	The Cat in the Hat
11	Gigli
8	From Justin to Kelly
7	Charlie's Angels: Full Throttle
5	Boat Trip
5	Spy Kids 3D: Game Over
4	House of 1000 Corpses
4	Kangaroo Jack
4	Marci X
3	Gods and Generals
3	The League of Extraordinary Gentlemen
2	Alex & Emma
2	Bad Boys 2
2	Basic
2	Dumb and Dumberer: When Harry Met Lloyd
2	The Fighting Temptations
2	Hulk
2	Johnny English
2	Legally Blonde 2: Red, White and Blonde
2	The Matrix Reloaded
2	The Matrix Revolutions
2	Radio
2	Scary Movie 3

The following films received multiple wins:

Wins	Film
5	Gigli
4	The Cat in the Hat
2	Charlie's Angels: Full Throttle
