= 2003 Teen Choice Awards =

American awards ceremony held in California

- Date: August 2, 2003
- Location: Universal Amphitheatre, Universal City, California
- Hosted by: David Spade

Television/radio coverage
- Network: Fox

The 2003 Teen Choice Awards ceremony was held on August 2, 2003, at the Universal Amphitheatre, Universal City, California. The awards celebrate the year's achievements in music, film, television, sports, fashion, comedy, video games, and the Internet, and were voted on by viewers living in the US, aged 13 and over through various social media sites. The event was hosted by David Spade with Kelly Clarkson, Evanescence, and The Donnas as performers.

== Performers ==
Performers included:

- Kelly Clarkson – "Low"
- Evanescence – "Going Under"
- The Donnas – "Too Bad About Your Girl"
- Verne Troyer as "5 Cent" – "In Da Club"

== Presenters ==
Presenters included

- Jamie Lee Curtis and Lindsay Lohan – presented Choice TV Actor: Comedy
- Jessica Alba and JC Chasez – presented Choice Breakout Movie Actress
- Alyssa Milano – introduced Evanescence
- Jessica Simpson and Nick Lachey – presented Choice TV Reality
- John Ritter, Amy Davidson, Kaley Cuoco, and Martin Spanjers – presented Choice TV Drama/Action Adventure
- Alexis Bledel, Jared Padalecki, and Milo Ventimiglia – presented Choice TV Reality Scariest Moment
- Amanda Bynes and Wilmer Valderrama – presented Choice TV Actress: Drama/Action Adventure
- Gregory Smith and Emily VanCamp – introduced surfboard presenters and "So You Want To Be A TV Star" film
- Jamie Kennedy and Tara Reid – presented Choice Movie: Drama/Action Adventure
- Ben McKenzie, Mischa Barton, and Adam Brody – introduced The Donnas
- Brittany Murphy and Dakota Fanning – presented Choice Movie Hissy Fit
- Justin Guarini and Brittany Snow – presented Choice TV Reality Grossest Moment
- Jillian Barberie, Tony Hawk, and Kelly Slater – presented Choice Male Hottie
- Alexa Vega, Raven-Symoné, and Lil' Romeo – introduced Verne Troyer as "5 Cent"
- Will Ferrell – presented Choice Movie Actor: Comedy
- Rebecca Romijn and Jimmy Kimmel – presented Choice Movie Villain
- Tom Green – presented Choice TV Reality Greatest Moment
- Tara Lipinski – introduced Kelly Clarkson
- Paula Abdul – presented Choice Male Athlete
- Dwayne "The Rock" Johnson and Britney Spears – presented Choice Movie Actress: Comedy

== Winners and nominees ==
Winners are listed first and highlighted in bold text.

=== Movies ===
Choice Movie: Drama/Action Adventure	Choice Movie Actor: Drama/Action Adventure
**The Matrix Reloaded**; 8 Mile; Blue Crush; Bulletproof Monk; Daredevil; Drumline; The Lord of the Rings: The Two Towers; X2: X-Men United	**Eminem – 8 Mile**; Ben Affleck – Daredevil; Nick Cannon – Drumline; Vin Diesel – XXX & A Man Apart; Colin Farrell – Daredevil & Phone Booth; Hugh Jackman – X2: X-Men United; Keanu Reeves – The Matrix Reloaded; Elijah Wood – The Lord of the Rings: The Two Towers
Choice Movie Actress: Drama/Action Adventure	Choice Movie: Comedy
**Jennifer Aniston – The Good Girl**; Halle Berry – Die Another Day & X2: X-Men United; Kate Bosworth – Blue Crush; Jennifer Garner – Daredevil; Brittany Murphy – 8 Mile; Jada Pinkett-Smith – The Matrix Reloaded; Queen Latifah – Chicago; Rebecca Romijn-Stamos – X2: X-Men United	**Sweet Home Alabama**; Anger Management; Bringing Down the House; Head of State; Jackass: The Movie; Kangaroo Jack; The Lizzie McGuire Movie; Malibu's Most Wanted
Choice Movie Actor: Comedy	Choice Movie Actress: Comedy
**Jim Carrey – Bruce Almighty**; Anthony Anderson – Kangaroo Jack; Jamie Kennedy – Malibu's Most Wanted; Ashton Kutcher – Just Married; Frankie Muniz – Agent Cody Banks; Mike Myers – Austin Powers in Goldmember; Chris Rock – Head of State; Adam Sandler – Anger Management	**Queen Latifah – Bringing Down the House**; Jennifer Aniston – Bruce Almighty; Sandra Bullock – Two Weeks Notice; Hilary Duff – The Lizzie McGuire Movie; Kate Hudson – How to Lose a Guy in 10 Days; Jennifer Lopez – Maid in Manhattan; Brittany Murphy – Just Married; Reese Witherspoon – Sweet Home Alabama
Choice Movie: Horror/Thriller	Choice Movie Villain
**The Ring**; Darkness Falls; Dreamcatcher; Final Destination 2; House of 1000 Corpses; Identity; Red Dragon; Signs	**Colin Farrell – Daredevil**; Christina Applegate – View from the Top; Candice Bergen – Sweet Home Alabama; Brian Cox – X2: X-Men United; Richard Gere – Chicago; Christian Kane – Just Married; Ian McKellen – X2: X-Men United; Michael Michele – How to Lose a Guy in 10 Days
Choice Breakout Movie Actor	Choice Breakout Movie Actress
**Eminem – 8 Mile**; Nick Cannon – Drumline; Michael Ealy – Barbershop & 2 Fast 2 Furious; Colin Farrell – The Recruit, Daredevil, & Phone Booth; Justin Guarini – From Justin to Kelly; Jake Gyllenhaal – The Good Girl; Derek Luke – Antwone Fisher; Mos Def – Brown Sugar	**Hilary Duff – The Lizzie McGuire Movie**; Monica Bellucci – Tears of the Sun & The Matrix Reloaded; Kelly Clarkson – From Justin to Kelly; Eve – Barbershop; Jennifer Garner – Daredevil; Beyoncé Knowles – Austin Powers in Goldmember; Queen Latifah – Chicago & Bringing Down the House; Nia Vardalos – My Big Fat Greek Wedding
Choice Movie Hissy Fit	Choice Movie Chemistry
**Adam Sandler – Anger Management**; Sandra Bullock – Two Weeks Notice; Michael Constantine – My Big Fat Greek Wedding; Kate Hudson – How to Lose a Guy in 10 Days; Ashton Kutcher – Just Married; Lucy Liu – Chicago; Steve Martin – Bringing Down the House; Jack Nicholson – Anger Management	**Paul Walker – 2 Fast 2 Furious**; Ben Affleck & Jennifer Garner – Daredevil; Jim Carrey & Morgan Freeman – Bruce Almighty; Kelly Clarkson & Justin Guarini – From Justin to Kelly; Taye Diggs & Sanaa Lathan – Brown Sugar; Anna Paquin & Shawn Ashmore – X2: X-Men United; Queen Latifah & Eugene Levy – Bringing Down the House; Derek Richardson & Eric Christian Olsen – Dumb and Dumberer: When Harry Met Lloyd
Choice Movie Liplock	Choice Movie Fight/Action Sequence
**Reese Witherspoon & Josh Lucas – Sweet Home Alabama**; Jennifer Aniston & Jake Gyllenhaal – The Good Girl; Leonardo DiCaprio & Cameron Diaz – Gangs of New York; Taye Diggs & Sanaa Lathan – Brown Sugar; Eminem & Brittany Murphy – 8 Mile; Kate Hudson & Matthew McConaughey – How to Lose a Guy in 10 Days; Ashton Kutcher & Brittany Murphy – Just Married; Jennifer Lopez & Ralph Fiennes – Maid in Manhattan	**Paul Walker vs. Tyrese – 2 Fast 2 Furious**; Ben Affleck vs. Michael Clarke Duncan – Daredevil; Battle for Helm's Deep – The Lord of the Rings: The Two Towers; Vin Diesel vs. Marton Csokas – XXX; Hugh Jackman vs. Kelly Hu – X2: X-Men United; Queen Latifah vs. Missi Pyle – Bringing Down the House; Keanu Reeves vs. Hugo Weaving – The Matrix Reloaded; Fann Wong vs. Palace Guards – Shanghai Knights
Choice Movie Liar	Choice Summer Movie
**Leonardo DiCaprio – Catch Me If You Can**; Jennifer Aniston – The Good Girl; Colin Farrell – Phone Booth; Kate Hudson – How to Lose a Guy in 10 Days; Jennifer Lopez – Maid in Manhattan; Matthew McConaughey – How to Lose a Guy in 10 Days; Rebecca Romijn-Stamos – X2: X-Men United; Renée Zellweger – Chicago	**Pirates of the Caribbean: The Curse of the Black Pearl**; 2 Fast 2 Furious; Bad Boys II; Charlie's Angels: Full Throttle; Hulk; The League of Extraordinary Gentlemen; Legally Blonde 2: Red, White & Blonde; Terminator 3: Rise of the Machines

=== Television ===
Choice TV Drama/Action Adventure	Choice TV Actor: Drama/Action Adventure
**7th Heaven**; 24; Alias; American Dreams; Buffy the Vampire Slayer; Dawson's Creek; Fastlane; Smallville	**David Gallagher – 7th Heaven**; Bill Bellamy – Fastlane; Joshua Jackson – Dawson's Creek; James Marsters – Buffy the Vampire Slayer; Gregory Smith – Everwood; Kiefer Sutherland – 24; Michael Vartan – Alias; Tom Welling – Smallville
Choice TV Actress: Drama/Action Adventure	Choice TV Comedy
**Sarah Michelle Gellar – Buffy the Vampire Slayer**; Jessica Biel – 7th Heaven; Jennifer Garner – Alias; Katie Holmes – Dawson's Creek; Kristin Kreuk – Smallville; Brittany Snow – American Dreams; Tiffani Thiessen – Fastlane; Emily VanCamp – Everwood	**Friends**; 8 Simple Rules; The Bernie Mac Show; Gilmore Girls; Lizzie McGuire; Malcolm in the Middle; Scrubs; That '70s Show
Choice TV Actor: Comedy	Choice TV Actress: Comedy
**Ashton Kutcher – That '70s Show**; Zach Braff – Scrubs; Topher Grace – That '70s Show; Matt LeBlanc – Friends; Bernie Mac – The Bernie Mac Show; Frankie Muniz – Malcolm in the Middle; Matthew Perry – Friends; John Ritter – 8 Simple Rules	**Jennifer Aniston – Friends**; Amanda Bynes – What I Like About You; Sarah Chalke – Scrubs; Courteney Cox – Friends; Kaley Cuoco – 8 Simple Rules; Hilary Duff – Lizzie McGuire; Mila Kunis – That '70s Show; Wanda Sykes – Wanda at Large
Choice TV Dating	Choice TV Reality
**Dismissed**; The 5th Wheel; Blind Date; Change of Heart; EX-treme Dating; Meet My Folks; Shipmates; Taildaters	**American Idol**; The Bachelor; Fear Factor; The Jamie Kennedy Experiment; Joe Millionaire; Punk'd; Survivor; Total Request Live
Choice Reality/Variety TV Star: Male	Choice Reality/Variety TV Star: Female
**Ruben Studdard – American Idol**; Clay Aiken – American Idol; Andrew Firestone – The Bachelor; Bob Guiney – The Bachelorette; Evan Mariott – Joe Millionaire; Dax Shepard – Punk'd; Matthew Von Ertfelda – Survivor	**Kelly Osbourne – The Osbournes**; Kimberly Caldwell – American Idol; Trishelle Cannatella – The Real World: Las Vegas; Kimberley Locke – American Idol; Jenna Morasca – Survivor; Trista Rehn – The Bachelorette; Jen Schefft – The Bachelor; Anna Nicole Smith – The Anna Nicole Show
Choice Reality/Variety TV Host	Choice Reality Hunk
**Ashton Kutcher – Punk'd**; Brooke Burns – Dog Eat Dog; Carson Daly – Total Request Live; Joey Fatone – Fame; Paul Hogan – Joe Millionaire; Jeff Probst – Survivor; Joe Rogan – Fear Factor; Ryan Seacrest – American Idol	**Ashton Kutcher – Punk'd**; Andrew Firestone – The Bachelor; Bob Guiney – The Bachelorette; Evan Mariott – Joe Millionaire
Choice Reality Babe	Choice TV Late Night
**Paula Abdul – American Idol**; Kimberly Caldwell – American Idol; Kelly Osbourne – The Osbournes; Anna Nicole Smith – The Anna Nicole Show	**Saturday Night Live**; The Daily Show with Jon Stewart; Jimmy Kimmel Live!; Last Call with Carson Daly; The Late Late Show with Craig Kilborn; Late Night with Conan O'Brien; Late Show with David Letterman; Mad TV
Choice Breakout TV Show	Choice Breakout TV Actor
**8 Simple Rules**; American Dreams; Everwood; George Lopez; Less than Perfect; Oliver Beene; Wanda at Large; What I Like About You	**George Stults – 7th Heaven**; Cedric the Entertainer – Cedric the Entertainer Presents; Wesley Jonathan – What I Like About You; Andrew Lawrence – Oliver Beene; George Lopez – George Lopez; Gregory Smith – Everwood; Mark Valley – Keen Eddie; Michael Vartan – Alias
Choice Breakout TV Actress	Choice TV Personality
**Kaley Cuoco – 8 Simple Rules**; Elisha Cuthbert – 24; Tamyra Gray – Boston Public; Sienna Miller – Keen Eddie; Ashlee Simpson – 7th Heaven; Brittany Snow – American Dreams; Wanda Sykes – Wanda at Large; Aisha Tyler – Friends	**Simon Cowell**; Carson Daly; Jimmy Fallon; Jamie Kennedy; Johnny Knoxville; Kelly Osbourne; Quddus; Ryan Seacrest
Choice TV Sidekick
**Wilmer Valderrama – That '70s Show**; Keiko Agena – Gilmore Girls; Mika Boorem – Dawson's Creek; Alyson Hannigan – Buffy the Vampire Slayer; Allison Mack – Smallville; Michael Rosenbaum – Smallville; Erik Per Sullivan – Malcolm in the Middle; Kevin Weisman – Alias

=== Music ===
Choice Male Artist	Choice Female Artist
**Eminem**; 50 Cent; JC Chasez; Ja Rule; John Mayer; Nelly; Sean Paul; Justin Timberlake	**Kelly Clarkson**; Christina Aguilera; Beyoncé; Missy Elliott; Norah Jones; Avril Lavigne; Jennifer Lopez; Pink
Choice R&B/Hip-Hop Artist	Choice Rap Artist
**Jennifer Lopez**; B2K; Brandy; Sean Paul; Kelly Rowland; Justin Timberlake; Tyrese; Usher	**Eminem**; 50 Cent; Missy Elliott; Ja Rule; Jay-Z; Nas; Nelly; Snoop Dogg
Choice Rock Group	Choice Single
**Good Charlotte**; 3 Doors Down; Audioslave; Coldplay; Linkin Park; No Doubt; Sum 41; The White Stripes	**"Sk8er Boi" – Avril Lavigne**; "All I Have" – Jennifer Lopez feat. LL Cool J; "Beautiful" – Christina Aguilera; "Bump, Bump, Bump" – B2K featuring P. Diddy; "Cry Me a River" – Justin Timberlake; "In da Club" – 50 Cent; "Underneath It All" – No Doubt feat. Lady Saw; "Work It" – Missy Elliott
Choice Album	Choice R&B/Hip-Hop Track
**The Young & the Hopeless – Good Charlotte**; Any Given Thursday – John Mayer; The Eminem Show – Eminem; Get Rich or Die Tryin' – 50 Cent; Justified – Justin Timberlake; Let Go – Avril Lavigne; Stripped – Christina Aguilera; This Is Me... Then – Jennifer Lopez	**"Like I Love You" – Justin Timberlake**; "4 Ever" – Lil' Mo feat. Fabolous; "How You Gonna Act Like That" – Tyrese; "No Letting Go" – Wayne Wonder; "Put That Woman First" – Jaheim; "Rock wit U (Awww Baby)" – Ashanti; "Snake" – R. Kelly feat. Big Tigger; "So Gone – Monica
Choice Rap Track	Choice Rock Track
**"In da Club" – 50 Cent**; "21 Questions" – 50 Cent feat. Nate Dogg; "Beautiful" – Snoop Dogg feat. Pharrell & Charlie Wilson; "Can't Let You Go" – Fabolous feat. Mike Shorey & Lil' Mo; "Excuse Me Miss" – Jay Z; "Get Busy" – Sean Paul; "I Can" – Nas; "I Know What You Want" – Busta Rhymes & Mariah Carey feat. Flipmode Squad	**"Bring Me to Life" – Evanescence**; "Headstrong" – Trapt; "Like a Stone" – Audioslave; "Price to Play" – Staind; "Send the Pain Below" – Chevelle; "Seven Nation Army" – The White Stripes; "Somewhere I Belong" – Linkin Park; "Times Like These" – Foo Fighters
Choice Love Song	Choice Breakout Music Artist
**"Crazy in Love" – Beyoncé feat. Jay-Z**; "Come Away with Me" – Norah Jones; "I'm Glad" – Jennifer Lopez; "I'm With You" – Avril Lavigne; "A Moment Like This" – Kelly Clarkson; "Picture" – Kid Rock feat. Sheryl Crow; "Pretty Baby" – Vanessa Carlton; "Running" – No Doubt	**50 Cent**; Beyoncé; Kelly Clarkson; Norah Jones; John Mayer; Sean Paul; Lisa Marie Presley; Justin Timberlake
Choice Music Hook Up (collaboration)	Choice Summer Song
**"21 Questions" – 50 Cent feat. Nate Dogg**; "'03 Bonnie & Clyde" – Jay Z feat. Beyoncé; "All I Have" – Jennifer Lopez feat. LL Cool J; "Cry Me a River" – Justin Timberlake feat. Timbaland; "Dilemma" – Nelly feat. Kelly Rowland; "Dirrty" – Christina Aguilera feat. Redman; "The Game of Love" – Santana feat. Michelle Branch; "Picture" – Kid Rock feat. Sheryl Crow	**"Crazy in Love" – Beyoncé feat. Jay Z**; "21 Questions" – 50 Cent feat. Nate Dogg; "Bring Me to Life" – Evanescence; "Get Busy" – Sean Paul; "Right Thurr" – Chingy; "Rock wit U (Awww Baby)" – Ashanti; "Shake Ya Tailfeather" – Nelly, Diddy & Murphy Lee; "Where Is the Love?" – The Black Eyed Peas

=== Miscellaneous ===
Choice Male Hottie	Choice Female Hottie
**Ashton Kutcher**; Colin Farrell; Josh Hartnett; Oliver Hudson; Brad Pitt; Justin Timberlake; Usher; Tom Welling	**Beyoncé Knowles**; Jessica Alba; Amanda Bynes; Hilary Duff; Jennifer Garner; Jennifer Lopez; Britney Spears; Gwen Stefani
Choice Crossover Artist	Choice Comedian
**Mandy Moore**; Kelly Clarkson; Eminem; Eve; Jennifer Love Hewitt; Beyoncé Knowles; Jennifer Lopez; Tyrese	**Jim Carrey**; Jimmy Fallon; Jamie Kennedy; Bernie Mac; Mike Myers; Chris Rock; Adam Sandler; Wanda Sykes
Choice Male Athlete	Choice Female Athlete
**Kobe Bryant**; Dale Earnhardt Jr.; Tony Hawk; Derek Jeter; Danny Kass; Shaquille O'Neal; Andy Roddick; Kelly Slater	**Serena Williams**; Jennifer Capriati; Kelly Clark; Mia Hamm; Anna Kournikova; Michelle Kwan; Mary Osborne; Venus Williams
Choice Male Fashion Icon	Choice Female Fashion Icon
**Ryan Seacrest**; Sean "P. Diddy" Combs; Common; Colin Farrell; Enrique Iglesias; Lenny Kravitz; Justin Timberlake; Usher	**Jennifer Lopez**; Halle Berry; Mary J. Blige; Beyoncé Knowles; Avril Lavigne; Kelly Osbourne; Britney Spears; Gwen Stefani
Choice Video Game
**Grand Theft Auto: Vice City**; Def Jam Vendetta; Enter the Matrix; The Legend of Zelda: The Wind Waker; Madden NFL 2003; NBA Street Vol. 2; Tom Clancy's Splinter Cell; Tony Hawk's Pro Skater 4
