= Stranger Things Have Happened (Justin Guarini album) =

Studio album by Justin Guarini
- Released: December 12, 2005
- Recorded: 2005
- Studio: Firehouse Studios, Pasadena, California
- Genre: Pop, rock, vocal
- Label: Justice Entertainment
- Producer: Justin Guarini, Greg Gordon Smith

Justin Guarini chronology
Justin Guarini (2003)	Stranger Things Have Happened (2005)

Stranger Things Have Happened is the second studio album of jazz standards by singer Justin Guarini that was released in 2005.

== Critical reception ==
Professional ratings
Review scores
Source	Rating
AllMusic	3.5/5 stars

Stephen Erlewine at AllMusic wrote that this album was the American Idol runner-up's attempt to reinvent himself after the failure of the movie From Justin to Kelly. The result is "loungey, Am-Idol-styled vocal jazz, but Stranger Things Have Happened is vocal jazz all the same...Guarini has genuine, natural charisma as a supper club-styled singer, and that charisma when contrasted with his band's jazz chops has a nice, relaxed appeal." Despite its weaknesses, the album was "a surprisingly successful reinvention."

== Track listing ==
No.	Title	Writer(s)	Length
1.	"Night & Day"	Cole Porter	3:44
2.	"My Funny Valentine"	Lorenz Hart, Richard Rodgers	3:51
3.	"Just Squeeze Me"	Duke Ellington, Lee Gaines	2:34
4.	"I'll Take Romance"	Ben Oakland, Oscar Hammerstein II	3:23
5.	"I Didn't Know What Time It Was"	Hart, Rodgers	2:49
6.	"I Love You"	Porter	3:20
7.	"Young and Foolish"	Albert Hague, Arnold B. Horwitt	2:25
8.	"All of You"	Porter	3:33
9.	"Stranger Things Have Happened to Me"	Greg Gordon Smith	3:34
10.	"Sing"	Joe Raposo	2:05
