= Boat Trip (film) =

- Film poster
- Directed by: Mort Nathan
- Screenplay by: Mort Nathan; William Bigelow
- Produced by: Sabine Müller: Frank Hübner; Brad Krevoy; Gerhard Schmidt; Andrew Sugerman
- Starring: Cuba Gooding Jr.; Horatio Sanz; Vivica A. Fox; Roselyn Sánchez; Maurice Godin; Lin Shaye; Bob Gunton; Victoria Silvstedt; Richard Roundtree; Roger Moore
- Cinematography: Shawn Maurer
- Edited by: John Axness
- Music by: Robert Folk
- Production companies: Nordisk Film; Motion Picture Corporation of America
- Distributed by: Artisan Entertainment
- Release dates: October 4, 2002 (United Kingdom); March 21, 2003 (United States)
- Running time: 94 minutes
- Countries: United States; Germany
- Language: English
- Budget: $15–20 million
- Box office: $15 million

Boat Trip is a 2002 romantic comedy film directed by Mort Nathan in his feature film directorial debut and starring Cuba Gooding Jr., Horatio Sanz, Vivica A. Fox, Roselyn Sánchez, and Roger Moore, with Lin Shaye and both then-unknown Thomas Lennon and Will Ferrell playing minor roles. The film is a story of two best friends who look for the best girl in a cruise ship. It’s an international co-production between the United States and Germany.

The film was released in theaters in the United Kingdom on October 4, 2002 and the United States on March 21, 2003 by Artisan Entertainment, and was both a critical and commercial failure. The film was panned due to its formulaic plot and humor, especially its reliance on stereotypical, homophobic jokes.

== Plot ==
Jerry and Nick are two close friends whose love lives have hit rock bottom. Jerry's girlfriend Felicia has turned down his marriage proposal in a hot air balloon after vomiting all over her and tells him she's met someone else. After Nick runs into a friend who is marrying a beautiful, younger girl he met on a singles cruise, he convinces Jerry to go on a similar cruise together.

While on their way to the travel agency, they get into a verbal altercation with a gay man who works at the agency they plan to book the cruise through. The manager attempts to patch things up by handling their booking personally and the situation appears to be handled well. After Jerry and Nick leave, it is revealed that the agent and manager, both men, are actually gay partners, and booked them on a cruise for gay men.

During their trip, Jerry falls in love with the cruise's dance instructor Gabriella and in order to win her over, he pretends to be gay so he can get closer to her. Meanwhile, Nick tries to get rescued by a helicopter flying over the ship by shooting a flare gun which hits the helicopter and it lands in the ocean. On the helicopter is the Swedish bikini team and Nick blossoms a romance with their captain, Inga. After an accidental affair with her mean, sex-obsessed coach Sonya, Nick must fend her off, after she has fallen in love with him as well.

Realizing she's still in love with Jerry, Felicia finds him on the cruise but outs that he's straight in front of Gabriella who's developed feelings for Jerry but doesn't want to be with a liar. Felicia tells Jerry they can get married and they leave together. At the wedding, Nick pretends to be in love with Jerry to stop him from making a mistake and with help from their new friends on the cruise, they fly Jerry to the new cruise ship Gabriella is working on.

In the end, Jerry wins Gabriella while Nick loses out on Inga but sees a potential relationship with her sister instead. However, he is then unwittingly (and unwillingly) reunited with Sonya; much to his disgust and her instant arousal upon seeing him.

== Cast ==
- Cuba Gooding Jr. as Jerry Robinson
- Horatio Sanz as Nick Ragoni
- Roselyn Sánchez as Gabriella
- Vivica A. Fox as Felicia
- Maurice Godin as Hector
- Roger Moore as Lloyd Faversham
- Lin Shaye as Coach Sonya
- Victoria Silvstedt as Inga
- Ken Campbell as Tom
- Zen Gesner as Ron
- William Bumiller as Steven
- Noah York as Perry
- Thomas Lennon as Pastor
- Richard Roundtree as Felicia's Dad
- Bob Gunton as Boat Captain
- Jennifer Gareis as Sheri
- Will Ferrell as Michael, Brian's boyfriend
- Artie Lange as Brian
- Jami Ferrell as Bridget
- Dean Baykan as Jeff

== Production ==
The film was shot in Summer 2001, primarily on the Mediterranean cruise ship traveling from Cologne, Germany to Athens, Greece. Production designer Charles William Breen built a sound stage for the staterooms, hallways, and bridge for the cruise ship itself. It was filmed for ten days before on that cruise ship before it stopped in Alexandria, Istanbul, and Rhodes. The island scenes were filmed on the isle of Hydra, Greece. In October 2002, Artisan Entertainment acquired North American distribution rights to the film.

== Release ==
Boat Trip was released on October 4, 2002 in the United Kingdom, February 20, 2003 in Germany, and March 21, 2003 in the US and Canada.

=== Home media ===
The film was released on VHS and DVD by Artisan Home Entertainment on September 30, 2003. For its original DVD release, it contained the theatrical R-rated cut and the unrated cut, and it featured an interactive main menu featuring Playboy models. Bonus features for its original DVD release also contained Trivia Track (trivia for the film), "Tanning Tips", outtakes and bloopers, and trailers for this film and other releases from Artisan, such as the "Extreme Edition" of Terminator 2: Judgment Day.

== Reception ==
=== Box office ===
Boat Trip opened in its US and Canada release at #10 by grossing $3,815,075 in 1,715 theatres. On a budget of $15–20 million, the film made its domestic gross of $8,600,126, with a total worldwide gross of $15,020,293, making it a failure at the box office.

=== Critical response ===
On the review aggregator website Rotten Tomatoes, 6% of 87 critics' reviews are positive. The website's consensus reads: "Boat Trip is a lame, juvenile farce that's heavy on stereotypes and desperate antics but short on brains and laughs." Metacritic, which uses a weighted average, assigned the film a score of 18 out of 100, based on 28 critics, indicating "overwhelming dislike".

Roger Ebert of the Chicago Sun-Times panned the film and wrote: "This is a movie made for nobody, about nothing." He continued: "Not that the film is outrageous. That would be asking too much. It is dim-witted, unfunny, too shallow to be offensive." Ebert included it at #3 on his list of the 10 worst films of 2003. Variety called it a "Washout. Lacking the mojo even to be offensive". The Guardian gave Boat Trip the paper's first ever zero-star review.

Many viewed the film as homophobic, although a reviewer for The Advocate wrote that the film was too terrible to protest. On the show Ebert & Roeper, Roger Ebert said the film "was so bad in so many different ways, not only does it offend gays, it offends everyone else." His co-host Richard Roeper said, "If the ship hit an iceberg, I would have been rooting for the iceberg." Chris Rock mentioned Gooding during the 2005 Oscars telecast for starring in this movie after receiving an Academy Award, joking that Gooding must have had serious financial problems to need star in such a bad film.

=== Accolades ===
The film was nominated for two Razzie Awards for Gooding as Worst Actor and for Mort Nathan as Worst Director, but "lost" both awards to Gigli. At the 2003 Stinkers Bad Movie Awards, the film received five nominations: Worst Picture, Worst Actor for Gooding, Worst Supporting Actor for Moore, Most Painfully Unfunny Comedy, and Worst On-Screen Couple for Gooding and anyone forced to co-star with him. Its only win was for Most Painfully Unfunny Comedy.

== See also ==
- List of comedy films of the 2000s
- List of LGBTQ-related films of the 2000s
- List of 21st century films considered the worst
