= Justin Guarini (album) =

Studio album by Justin Guarini
- Released: June 10, 2003
- Length: 49:05
- Label: RCA; 19
- Producer: Peer Åström; Babyface; Anders "Bag" Bagge; David Frank; Steve Mac; Lester Mendez; The Party People; Wade Robson; Damon Sharpe; Soulshock & Karlin; The Underdogs

Justin Guarini chronology
Justin Guarini (2003)	Stranger Things Have Happened (2005)

Justin Guarini is the self-titled debut album from American Idol season one runner-up Justin Guarini. It was released by RCA Records on June 10, 2003. The album debuted and peaked at number twenty on the US Billboard 200 with first week sales of 57,000 units. By October 2008, it had sold 143,000 copies.

== Background ==
In a radio interview, American Idol host Ryan Seacrest, remarked of Guarini, "Following his season, there was a huge hype surrounding Justin and no one could believe the hysteria. But, everything was new and they weren't quite sure what to do. With a show like American Idol the window of opportunity is very, very small. Also, Justin had creative conflicts with his record company as far as the direction of the album that additionally aided in putting him past that window of opportunity. After the first season, they learned to capitalize on the window of opportunity for non-winners keeping them in the public eye with singles, videos, rushed CDs, etc., something that didn't happen for Justin".

In an interview with MTV, Guarini spoke of the experience saying, "It really has been just Music Industry Education 101. I learned a lot from it ... And it's not a finger-pointing issue to me; I take as much responsibility as I can."

Originally the song "Sorry" was planned as the first single release from the album, but later it was decided that there would be two "first" singles. "Sorry" was released to MTV and pop radio, while his cover version of "Unchained Melody" was sent to R&B and adult contemporary stations.

== Critical reception ==
Professional ratings
Review scores
Source	Rating
AllMusic	3.5/5 stars
Entertainment Weekly	D+
MTV Asia	6/10
Slant Magazine	2.5/5 stars

AllMusic's Heather Phares wrote: "In the end, this album isn't as surprising or diverse a debut as Thankful was, but its solid quality proves that the forces behind American Idol want their winners to make good pop albums, as opposed to one mega-hit single backed by 11 throwaway tracks. Justin Guarini might be calculated, but it's not cynical." Sal Cinquemani of Slant Magazine was critical of the "drab balladry" and "predictable R&B material" throughout the record but felt it was "a more cohesive effort" than Clarkson's Thankful. Henry Goldblatt of Entertainment Weekly gave the album an overall D+ grade, saying: "Even his most rabid fans will recognize Guarini's innocuous, focus-grouped, you-know-you-wanna-love-me ballads as songs that should be greeting Kmart shoppers."

== Commercial performance ==
Justin Guarini debuted at number twenty on the US Billboard 200 with first week sales of 57,000 units. By October 2008, it had sold 143,000 copies, according to USA Today.

== Track listing ==
Justin Guarini track listing
No.	Title	Writer(s)	Producer(s)	Length
1.	"One Heart Too Many"	Derek Bramble; Greeg Pagan; Juliet Taylor-Stanley	Lester Mendez	3:33
2.	"I Saw Your Face"	Antonio Dixon; Kenneth "Babyface" Edmonds; Harvey Mason, Jr.	The Underdogs; Babyface	4:05
3.	"Be a Heartbreaker"	David Frank; Nate Butler; Steve Kipner	Frank	3:31
4.	"Unchained Melody"	Alex North; Hy Zaret	Steve Mac	3:26
5.	"Sorry"	Alex Cantrell; Kenneth Karlin; Phillip "Silky" White; Carsten Schack	Soulshock & Karlin	4:14
6.	"How Will You Know"	Edmonds; Damon Thomas; Mason Jr.	The Underdogs; Babyface	4:04
7.	"Inner Child"	Gregg Alexander; Rick Nowels	The Party People	3:18
8.	"Condition of My Heart"	Brian McKnight	The Underdogs; Babyface	3:57
9.	"Doin' Things (We're Not Supposed To)"	Damon Sharpe; Joe Belmaati; Mich Hedin Hansen	Sharpe	3:50
10.	"If You Wanna"	Justin Guarini; Carole Bayer Sager; Wade Robson	Wade J. Robson	3:24
11.	"Thinking of You"	Anthony Nance; Dixon; Justin Timberlake; Mason Jr., Thomas	The Underdogs; Babyface	3:51
12.	"Get Here"	Brenda Russell	The Underdogs; Babyface	3:54
13.	"Timeless" (duet with Kelly Clarkson from From Justin to Kelly)	Anders "Bag" Bagge; Peer Åström; Henrik Norberg; Karen Poole; Oscar Merner	Bagge; Åström	6:38
Total length:				49:05

== Personnel ==
Adapted from AllMusic.

Vocals

- Nancy Anderson – background vocals
- Nate Butler – background vocals
- Kelly Clarkson – featured vocals
- Eric Dawkins – background vocals
- Justin Guarini – primary artist, background vocals
- Mae McKenna – background vocals
- Jeanette Olsson – background vocals
- Tuff Singers – background vocals

Musicians

- Dave Arch – keyboards
- Edwin Bonilla – percussion
- Luis Conte – percussion
- Tony Dixon – keyboards
- Nathan East – bass
- David Frank – drums, keyboards
- Sean Hurley – bass
- Eric D. Jackson – guitar
- Paul Jackson, Jr. – electric guitar
- Fridrik Karlsson – guitar
- Greg Kurstin - keyboards
- Ricky Lawson – drums
- Manuel Lopez – guitar (nylon string)
- Steve Mac – keyboards
- Oscar Merner – guitar (nylon string)
- Party Man – keyboards
- Steve Pearce – guitar (bass)
- Greg Phillinganes – keyboards, piano
- John Pierce – bass
- Tim Pierce – guitar
- Ramón Stagnaro – guitar (nylon string)
- Michael Hart Thompson – guitar
- Gavyn Wright – strings

Production

- Kwaku Alston – photography
- Dave Arch – orchestral arrangements
- Peer Åström – arranger, engineer, mixing, producer
- Bag – arranger
- Paul Boutin – engineer
- Henrik Brunberg – assistant engineer
- Nate Butler – vocal arrangement
- Bag – arranger
- Clive Davis – executive producer
- David Frank – producer, programming, vocal arrangement
- Ryan Freeland – engineer
- Chris Garcia – engineer
- Dabling Harward – editing
- Havana Hustlers – programming
- Matt Howe – engineer
- Janson & Janson – conductor, string arrangements
- Karlin – arranger
- Steve Kipner – vocal arrangement
- Christian Lantry – photography
- Chris Laws – engineer
- Jolie Levine-aller – production coordination
- Bernard Löhr – mixing assistant, string engineer
- Juan Cristobal Losada – engineer
- Steve Mac – mixing, producer
- Kev Mahoney – assistant engineer
- Bill Malina – engineer, mixing
- Manny Marroquin – mixing
- Lester Mendez – producer
- Matz Nilsson – mixing
- Larrabee North – mixing
- Daniel Pursey – assistant engineer
- Jason Rankins – assistant engineer
- Wade Robson – engineer, mixing, producer, vocal arrangement
- Wayne Rodrigues – drum programming, pro-Tools
- Jesse Rogg – assistant engineer
- Bob Rosa – assistant vocal engineer
- Dave Russell – engineer, mixing
- Robin Sellers – mixing
- Damon Sharpe – engineer, producer
- Joel Shepard – assistant engineer
- Soulshock – arranger, mixing, producer
- Stockholm Session Orchestra – strings
- Rabeka Tuinei – mixing assistant
- The Underdogs – producer
- Alan Veucasovic – assistant engineer
- Joe Yannece – mastering

== Charts ==
Weekly chart performance for Justin Guarini
Chart (2009)	Peak position
US Billboard 200	20
