= Kangaroo Jack: G'Day U.S.A.! =

2004 american animated action comedy film

- Promotional poster
- Directed by: Ron Myrick; Jeffrey Gatrall
- Screenplay by: Adam Scheinman; Andrew Scheinman
- Based on: Kangaroo Jack by Steve Bing; Barry O'Brien
- Produced by: Ron Myrick
- Starring: Jeff Bennett; Josh Keaton; Keith Diamond; Phil LaMarr; Kath Soucie; Ahmed Best; Steven Miller
- Edited by: Susan Edmunson
- Music by: Randall Crissman
- Production companies: Warner Bros. Animation; Castle Rock Entertainment
- Distributed by: Warner Home Video
- Release date: November 16, 2004
- Running time: 77 minutes
- Country: United States
- Language: English

Kangaroo Jack: G'Day U.S.A.! (also known as Kangaroo Jack 2 or Kangaroo Jack 2: G'Day U.S.A.!) is a 2004 American animated action comedy film. It is a sequel to 2003's Kangaroo Jack that is directed by Ron Myrick and Jeffrey Gatrall. Released direct-to-video in 2004, it was produced by Warner Bros. Animation and Castle Rock Entertainment and distributed by Warner Home Video. Adam and Andrew Scheinman wrote the film. The DVD extras have a runtime of over 50 minutes.

== Plot ==
In an introductory dream sequence, Charlie Carbone and Louis Booker film a commercial for their shampoo company in Australia which is directed by their kangaroo friend Jackie Legs. Louis believes that his dream means that Jackie is in trouble, but Charlie, Louis's best friend, and Charlie's wife Jessie, believe that it was simply a dream. They are back in Australia, trying to find a local Aboriginal tribe, who can help them find some sweet-smelling berries to use for their new line of shampoo. During this, the trio eventually find the tribe, but the tribal leader Ankamuti explains that his people have lost the source of their mystical power, four precious jewels. He believes that Charlie and Louis are the chosen ones that are supposed to help find and return the ancient gems.

While searching for the gems, the three stop and reunite with Jackie Legs, along with his family. A group of animal smugglers raid the area, during which Jackie is separated from his family and captured. Charlie, Louis, and Jessie plan to rescue Jackie and the rest of the animals held captive by the poachers.

The three sneak into the back of a truck, where they find a tranquilized Jackie and hide in a crate. When one of the smugglers attempt to find out what is hiding in the crate, Louis accidentally passes gas, which scares the smugglers out and the three get hauled away.

The next day, Charlie, Louis, and Jessie are shipped from Sydney to Las Vegas, where Jackie and the other animals are headed to. The animals are being sent to Outback Ollie, a television show host and zookeeper. The three end up in a warehouse in Las Vegas with the animals. While a group of criminals are spying on them, Charlie, Louis, and Jessie break out Jackie, who is still unconscious. The four find a golf cart and drive out of the warehouse.

The four run into limousine driver and exterminator Ronald Booker, Louis' cousin. They get in his limo in an attempt to avoid further attention. Jackie hops out of the limo and heads towards other vehicles on the highway, causing a traffic jam.

Jackie and the group hide in an apartment building, but are confronted by two cops who attempt to arrest them for jewel theft and animal smuggling. However, Louis attacks and knocks out both cops, revealing them to be fake. Ronald leaves the crew on their own. The three use his limo to follow Ronald, damaging his vehicle in the process. They end up in Mrs. Sperling's backyard, where the crew find Jackie. He then escapes and goes to the boating resort and the three catch up with him, with the help of Outback Ollie.

Ollie promises that he will return Jackie to Australia, but betrays the three. The crew then head over to Ollie's zoo, where he is about to kill the captured animals. Charlie, Louis, and Jessie, along with the help of Ronald and the FBI, expose Ollie as a criminal. Ollie holds Jessie hostage and threatens to have her killed by the crocodiles, but Jackie rescues her. As a result of the bust, Ollie and his henchmen are arrested while the gems are returned to Charlie, Louis, and Jessie.

A few days later, Jackie and the rest of the animals are returned to Australia. Charlie, Louis, and Jessie return to Ankamuti to give him the gems, and in return Ankamuti gives them the ability to understand Jackie and the other animals' speech. Jackie thanks them for saving him and says that they are truly "friends for life".

== Cast ==
- Jeff Bennett as Kangaroo "Jackie Legs" Jack, a rapping red kangaroo. He was previously voiced by Adam Garcia in the first film.
  - Bennett also voices Larry the echidna and a lounge singer.
- Josh Keaton as Charlie Carbone, the owner of a shampoo company and stepson of Salvatore Maggio. He was previously portrayed by Jerry O'Connell in the first film.
- Ahmed Best as Louis Booker, Charlie's slow-witted, but good-hearted best friend. He was previously portrayed by Anthony Anderson in the first film.
- Kath Soucie as Jessie Carbone, Charlie's wife and a former wildlife preserve worker. She was previously portrayed by Estella Warren in the first film.
  - Soucie also voices Mrs. Sperling, one of Ronald's customers who sets up booby traps for aliens.
- Keith Diamond as Ronald Booker, Louis' selfish and unintelligent cousin who works as an exterminator by day and a limousine driver by night.
  - Diamond also voices Killer Putulski, a boxer who appears in Louis' dream.
- Jim Ward as Outback Ollie, a park owner and television host who covers up his illegal smuggling activities.
- Phil LaMarr as Rico and Mikey, Ollie's henchmen. Chief Ankamuti describes them as "the man with the smiling forehead" (really a scar) and "the one who carries a snake on his arm" (really a tattoo).
- Obba Babatundé as Ankamuti, the leader and medicine man of the Aborigines. Charlie thinks he's a lunatic. Louis always mispronounces his name.
- Dorian Harewood as Agent Jackson, an FBI agent.
- Carlos Alazraqui as Dude #1
- Jess Harnell as an unnamed frilled lizard.
  - Harnell also voices Dude #2.
- Jeannie Elias as Elderly Woman
- Wendee Lee as Limousine Girl
- Steve Miller as an emu that was caught by Rico and Mikey.
- Frank Welker as Special Vocal Effects.

== Crew ==
- Jamie Simone - Casting and voice director

== Songs ==
The film featured a rendition of LL Cool J's single "Mama Said Knock You Out" during the dream boxing scene. The film also featured a few lines from "I Only Have Eyes for You" when Jackie is in the lounge. Jeff Bennett performed both songs and the song that plays when Jackie is causing havoc is the Ohio Players song "Fire".

== Reception ==
Kangaroo Jack: G'Day U.S.A.! was met with mixed-to-negative reviews from critics and audiences, but most consider it an improvement over the original.

== See also ==
- List of films set in Las Vegas
