= From Justin to Kelly =

2003 film by Robert Iscove

- Theatrical release poster
- Directed by: Robert Iscove
- Written by: Kim Fuller
- Produced by: Robert Engelman; Nikki Boella
- Starring: Kelly Clarkson; Justin Guarini
- Cinematography: Francis Kenny
- Edited by: Tirsa Hackshaw; Casey O. Rohrs
- Music by: Gregory Siff; Michael Wandmacher
- Production company: 19 Entertainment
- Distributed by: 20th Century Fox
- Release date: June 20, 2003
- Running time: 81 minutes
- Country: United States
- Language: English
- Budget: $12 million
- Box office: $4.9 million

From Justin to Kelly is a 2003 American musical romantic comedy film, written by Kim Fuller and directed by Robert Iscove. The movie features Kelly Clarkson, the winner of the first season of American Idol, and Justin Guarini, the runner-up. A critical and commercial failure, the film received the Golden Raspberry Award for "Worst 'Musical' of Our First 25 Years" in 2005. It has gained a reputation as one of the worst films ever made.

== Plot ==
In Texas, Kelly Taylor works as a waitress and singer at a bar where she attracts the attention of many cowboys, including Luke. Her college classmates, Alexa and Kaya, invite her to join them on a spring break vacation in Fort Lauderdale, Florida. Despite finding the typical spring break activities demeaning, Kelly decides to go on the trip to escape her miserable job. In Miami, college student Justin Bell is also on vacation with his friends Brandon and Eddie, who run a party promoter business called BR&J.

Upon arriving in Fort Lauderdale, Kelly, Alexa, and Kaya attend a beach concert where Kelly first encounters Justin. During the concert, Justin and Brandon offer Eddie dating advice before leaving. Later, Justin and Kelly search for each other at a party, eventually finding each other in a bathroom. Kelly attempts to give Justin her phone number on a napkin but misses, causing it to fall into a puddle. Unable to retrieve her number, Kelly leaves. Justin then asks Alexa for Kelly's number, but Alexa gives him her own number instead, pretending it is Kelly's. That night, she texts Justin, pretending to be Kelly, and rejects his advances. Meanwhile, Kaya begins a romantic relationship with Carlos, a busboy, and they enjoy a night out at a Salsa club.

The next day, Alexa signs up Kelly for BR&J's whipped cream bikini contest, hoping to observe Justin's character. Kelly initially feels angry at Justin for participating in such a degrading event, but they later run into each other at a food truck. They decide to go on a boat ride together and connect during their time on the boat. They make plans to meet at the beach the following night. Meanwhile, Brandon receives a ticket for hosting the contest without a permit, and Kaya complains to Carlos' boss about his mistreatment, resulting in Carlos being fired.

Alexa, pretending to be Kelly, texts Justin and instructs him to meet her at a bar instead of the beach. Alexa sings about her desire for love, and when Justin arrives, she tells him that Kelly has a boyfriend back home. She calls Luke and asks him to come to Florida. Eddie continues his search for his online date but gets beaten up by a jock and misses their rendezvous.

Later, Kelly feels upset when Justin fails to show up at the beach. Luke appears and claims that Kelly is his girlfriend. Luke and Justin decide to settle their differences through a hovercraft race, but Luke gets injured during the race. Brandon receives another ticket, this time from Cutler, the police officer, for gambling on the race. Justin seeks advice from Alexa on how to win Kelly back, but Alexa kisses him, which Kelly witnesses. Carlos becomes angry with Kaya for interfering in his life but later realizes he should have stood up to his boss earlier. He apologizes to Kaya by arranging a romantic dinner for them in a pool.

Kelly watches from a distance as Alexa approaches, pretending to want food. Kelly confronts her about Luke and Justin, and Alexa lies, claiming that Justin called her and said he only wanted to be with Alexa. Kelly apologizes. Later, at a bar, the girls are dancing when Justin arrives and tries to get Kelly's attention. She leaves, and he follows her, confronting her about her recent behavior. Kelly reveals what Alexa told her, and they argue. Kelly realizes something is amiss as Justin storms off. Back inside, Kelly picks up Alexa's phone when it falls and discovers the messages between her and Justin. Alexa confesses to being jealous of the attention Kelly receives from guys. Kelly leaves, and Justin approaches her. Alexa tells Kelly she stopped Justin and admits to trying to keep them apart. She arranges for Justin and Kelly to reunite.

The following day, Justin and Kelly, Kaya and Carlos, Brandon and Cutler, and Eddie and Lizzie all dance at a pool party, enjoying their time together.

== Cast ==
- Kelly Clarkson as Kelly Taylor
- Justin Guarini as Justin Bell
- Katherine Bailess as Alexa
- Anika Noni Rose as Kaya
- Brian Dietzen as Eddie
- Greg Siff as Brandon
- Jason Yribar as Carlos
- Christopher Bryan as Luke
- Theresa San-Nicholas as Officer Cutler
- Justin Gorence as Greg
- Kaitlin Riley as Ashley
- Marc Macaulay as Mr. O'Mara
- Jessica Sutta as Nadine
- Zachary Woodlee and Robert Hoffman as Featured Dancers

== Production ==
From Justin to Kelly was produced within a relatively short timeframe of approximately two and a half months. During this period, three weeks were allocated for actor readings of the script, which were accompanied by ongoing script revisions. Additionally, this timeframe also encompassed rehearsals for dances and singing prior to the commencement of the six-week shooting schedule. R. J. Helton and Christina Christian, both former American Idol competitors, paid visits to the film's set; however, they do not make appearances in the final cut of the movie.

== Release ==
Some theater chains were concerned when distributor 20th Century Fox announced its intention to release the film on VHS and DVD a mere six weeks after its opening weekend. In response, they threatened not to screen the film at all. However, Fox eventually changed its stance and delayed the release by several months. Following a disappointing performance during its initial weekend, Fox decided to revert to the original release schedule, and the film was eventually made available to the public through home media on August 26, 2003.

== Reception ==
=== Box office ===
In its opening weekend, From Justin to Kelly grossed $2,715,848 in 2,001 theaters in the United States and Canada, ranking #11 at the box office. By the end of its run on July 24, 2003, the film had grossed $4,928,883 in the domestic box office. Based on a $12 million budget, the film was a box-office bomb.

=== Critical reception ===
On the review aggregator website Rotten Tomatoes, 8% of 63 critics' reviews are positive, with an average rating of 3.1/10. The website's consensus reads: "A notorious stinker, From Justin To Kelly features banal songs, a witless plot, and non-existent chemistry between its American Idol-sanctioned leads." Metacritic, which uses a weighted average, assigned the film a score of 14 out of 100, based on 16 critics, indicating "overwhelming dislike". Audiences polled by CinemaScore gave the film an average grade of "C+" on an A+ to F scale.

Entertainment Weekly film critic Owen Gleiberman wrote in his review, "How bad is From Justin to Kelly? Set in Miami during spring break, it's like Grease: The Next Generation acted out by the food-court staff at SeaWorld." Time magazine described the film as "a monstrous Idol movie musical that in the most generous light is the worst film so far this century".

=== Reception from Clarkson ===
Clarkson has since stated that before the film went into production, she tearfully pleaded with the creator of American Idol to be relieved from the contractual obligation to star in the film, and that she has always disliked From Justin to Kelly. In an interview, she admitted participating in the film only because she was contractually obligated to do so: "I knew when I read the script it was going to be real, real bad, but when I won, I signed that piece of paper, and I could not get out of it."

=== Accolades ===
The film is listed in Golden Raspberry Award founder John Wilson's book The Official Razzie Movie Guide as one of the 100 Most Enjoyably Bad Movies Ever Made.

The choreography was considered so bad that a special Golden Raspberry "Governor's Award" was created as an excuse to present the film with a Razzie.

Total Film magazine ranked the film at number 16 in their list of "66 Worst Movies Of All Time".

Award	Category	Recipient	Result
Dallas–Fort Worth Film Critics Association Awards	Worst Film		Nominated
Golden Raspberry Awards (2003)	Worst Picture	Robert Engelman and Nikki Boella	Nominated
Golden Raspberry Awards (2003)	Worst Director	Robert Iscove	Nominated
Golden Raspberry Awards (2003)	Worst Actor	Justin Guarini	Nominated
Golden Raspberry Awards (2003)	Worst Actress	Kelly Clarkson	Nominated
Golden Raspberry Awards (2003)	Worst Screenplay	Kim Fuller	Nominated
Golden Raspberry Awards (2003)	Worst Screen Couple	Kelly Clarkson and Justin Guarini	Nominated
Golden Raspberry Awards (2003)	Worst Prequel or Sequel	From Justin to Kelly (remake of both Where the Boys Are and Where the Boys Are '84)	Nominated
Golden Raspberry Awards (2003)	Worst Excuse for an Actual Movie (All Concept/No Content)		Nominated
Golden Raspberry Awards (2003)	Governor's Award for Distinguished Under-Achievement in Choreography	Travis Payne	Won
Golden Raspberry Awards (2004)	Worst "Musical" of Our First 25 Years		Won
Stinkers Bad Movie Awards	Worst Picture	Robert Engelman and Nikki Boella	Nominated
Stinkers Bad Movie Awards	Worst Director	Robert Iscove	Nominated
Stinkers Bad Movie Awards	Worst Actor	Justin Guarini	Nominated
Stinkers Bad Movie Awards	Worst Actress	Kelly Clarkson	Nominated
Stinkers Bad Movie Awards	Worst On-Screen Couple	Kelly Clarkson and Justin Guarini	Nominated
Stinkers Bad Movie Awards	Worst On-Screen Group	The Pennsylvania Posse	Nominated
Stinkers Bad Movie Awards	Most Annoying Fake Accent (Female)	Kelly Clarkson	Nominated
Stinkers Bad Movie Awards	Worst Song or Song Performance in a Film or Its End Credits	"Anytime" by Kelly Clarkson and Justin Guarini	Won
Teen Choice Awards	Choice Movie Chemistry	Kelly Clarkson and Justin Guarini	Nominated
Teen Choice Awards	Choice Breakout Movie Actor	Justin Guarini	Nominated
Teen Choice Awards	Choice Breakout Movie Actress	Kelly Clarkson	Nominated

== Home media ==
The DVD release includes an extended version of 90 minutes which has two new musical numbers, "From Me to You" and "Brighter Star", additional lyrics, more sensual choreography to "Wish Upon a Star", and a scene involving a "Dare to Be Bare" contest.

== Soundtrack ==
A commercial soundtrack with studio tracks was produced but remains unreleased due to the film's negative reception and unsatisfactory box office returns. However, a version of the song "Timeless", sung by Clarkson and Guarini, and recorded prior to the film, was included on Guarini's self-titled debut album. The tracks of the unreleased studio soundtrack can be found on various Clarkson fan sites. Two songs, "From Me to You" and "Brighter Star", did not appear in the theatrical release, but were added to the extended version DVD release. Clarkson also performed "The Bounce (The Luv)", and "Timeless" during her shared (with Clay Aiken) "Independent Tour" in 2003 with her male backup singer performing the male vocals on "Timeless".

Songs used in the film and soundtrack (in order of appearance):

1. "I Won't Stand in Line" (Original artist: Reba McEntire)
2. "Vacation" (Original artist: The Go-Go's)
3. "The Bounce (The Luv)"
4. "Brandon's Rap"
5. "Forever Part of Me"
6. "It's Meant to Be"
7. "Timeless" (Also released on Guarini's debut CD Justin Guarini)
8. "Brighter Star" (Extended version)
9. "Wish Upon a Star"
10. "Anytime" (Alternate version on Clarkson's debut CD Thankful)
11. "Madness"
12. "Timeless (Reprise)"
13. "From Me to You" (Extended version)
14. "Anytime (Reprise)"
15. "That's the Way (I Like It)" (Lyrically changed cover of a song by KC and the Sunshine Band)
16. "Sugar"

== See also ==
- List of 21st-century films considered the worst
