= Gigli =

2003 film by Martin Brest

- Theatrical release poster
- Directed by: Martin Brest
- Written by: Martin Brest
- Produced by: Martin Brest; Casey Silver
- Starring: Ben Affleck; Jennifer Lopez; Justin Bartha; Al Pacino; Christopher Walken; Lainie Kazan
- Cinematography: Robert Elswit
- Edited by: Julie Monroe; Billy Weber
- Music by: John Powell
- Production companies: Columbia Pictures; Revolution Studios; Casey Silver Productions; City Light Films
- Distributed by: Sony Pictures Releasing
- Release date: August 1, 2003
- Running time: 121 minutes
- Country: United States
- Language: English
- Budget: $75.6 million
- Box office: $7.3 million

Gigli (/ˈʒiːli/ ZHEE-lee) is a 2003 American romantic comedy crime film written, co-produced, and directed by Martin Brest. The film stars Ben Affleck, Jennifer Lopez, and Justin Bartha, with Al Pacino, Christopher Walken, and Lainie Kazan in supporting roles. It follows a low-ranking Los Angeles mobster who kidnaps the brother of a federal prosecutor and is then ordered to work with a female enforcer sent to supervise him.

Produced for Revolution Studios, Gigli was developed during the company's early push toward filmmaker-driven star vehicles. Halle Berry was originally set to co-star before being replaced by Lopez. After principal photography, the film was substantially reworked following poor test screenings and disagreements between Brest and studio executives over its tone and ending. Its release was also overshadowed by intense publicity surrounding the off-screen relationship between Affleck and Lopez, which became a major focus of the film's marketing and press coverage.

Released by Sony Pictures Releasing on August 1, 2003, Gigli received overwhelmingly negative reviews from critics. It grossed $7.3 million worldwide against a budget of $75.6 million, making it one of the most expensive box-office bombs in film history. In later years, it became widely cited as a symbol of high-profile Hollywood failure and shorthand for an embarrassing flop. It remains Brest's final feature film as a director to date.

== Plot ==
Larry Gigli is a low-level Los Angeles mobster who is eager to prove himself tougher and more capable than he is. His superior, Louis, orders him to kidnap Brian, the younger brother of a federal prosecutor who has an intellectual disability, so the prosecutor can be pressured into helping New York mob boss Starkman avoid prison.

Larry lures Brian away by promising to take him "to the Baywatch", referring to the television series that Brian is fixated on. Although Larry completes the abduction, Louis does not trust him to handle the situation alone and sends another associate, a woman who calls herself Ricki, to supervise him. Larry is immediately attracted to Ricki, but resents Louis's lack of confidence in him and dislikes taking orders from her. He is also irritated by Brian's constant demands to go to "the Baywatch". Ricki tells Larry that she is a lesbian, rebuffing his attempts to flirt with her.

Brian also has a love for the Australian accent spoken by a woman, so he runs up insurmountable phone bills calling Australia and talking to an Australian operator.

As Larry, Ricki, and Brian hide out in Larry's apartment, the kidnapping becomes more dangerous. Louis orders Larry and Ricki to cut off Brian's thumb and send it to the prosecutor. Horrified by the instruction, Larry instead sneaks into a hospital morgue, removes a corpse's thumb, and mails it as if it belonged to Brian. During this period, Larry grows closer to Ricki and speaks more openly about himself, his family, and his frustrations with his life. Ricki begins to soften toward him, and the two eventually sleep together.

Larry and Ricki are then summoned to meet Starkman. Starkman reveals that he never approved the kidnapping scheme and is furious that Louis acted without authorization. He is even more angered by the severed thumb sent to the prosecutor, since it does not match Brian's fingerprints and therefore exposes the bluff rather than increasing pressure. Concluding that Louis has created unnecessary scrutiny from law enforcement and mishandled the situation, Starkman kills him.

Starkman then turns on Larry and Ricki, prepared to have them killed as well. Ricki persuades him to spare them by arguing that only they know where Brian is and are therefore the only people who can contain the damage and prevent Brian from identifying anyone connected to the kidnapping. Starkman reluctantly agrees and sends them away.

Realizing they are no longer safe in the mob, Larry and Ricki decide to flee together and abandon their criminal lives. They take Brian with them and discuss returning him to where Larry first found him. While driving along the coast, they come across a beach video shoot resembling the kind of imagery Brian associates with Baywatch. Brian begs to be dropped off there, and Larry and Ricki finally agree. Brian talks to one of the women there, and is over the moon that she's Australian.

Larry urges Ricki to take his car and leave without him so she will be safe, but after she drives off, she changes her mind and returns for him. The two reunite, pick up their escape together, and drive away to begin a new life.

== Cast ==
- Ben Affleck as Larry Gigli
- Jennifer Lopez as Ricki/Rochelle
- Justin Bartha as Brian
- Lainie Kazan as Mrs. Gigli
- Al Pacino as Starkman
- Lenny Venito as Louis
- Missy Crider as Robin
- Christopher Walken as Stanley Jacobellis
- Terrence Camilleri as Man in Dryer

== Production ==
Produced for Revolution Studios, Gigli formed part of Joe Roth's early strategy for the studio, which was launched in 2000 to make about half a dozen mid-budget films a year for release through Sony. Tim Robey wrote that Roth initially aimed to keep Revolution's films below $50 million, but Sony's commercial rebound in 2002 encouraged a more expensive 2003 slate; after several costly underperformers, including Gigli, Revolution lowered budgets, curtailed back-end deals and reduced staff. In 2003, the Los Angeles Times reported that Brest, like Ron Shelton, had been allowed to write, produce and direct his picture with final cut, an arrangement Revolution later reconsidered after those underperformers.

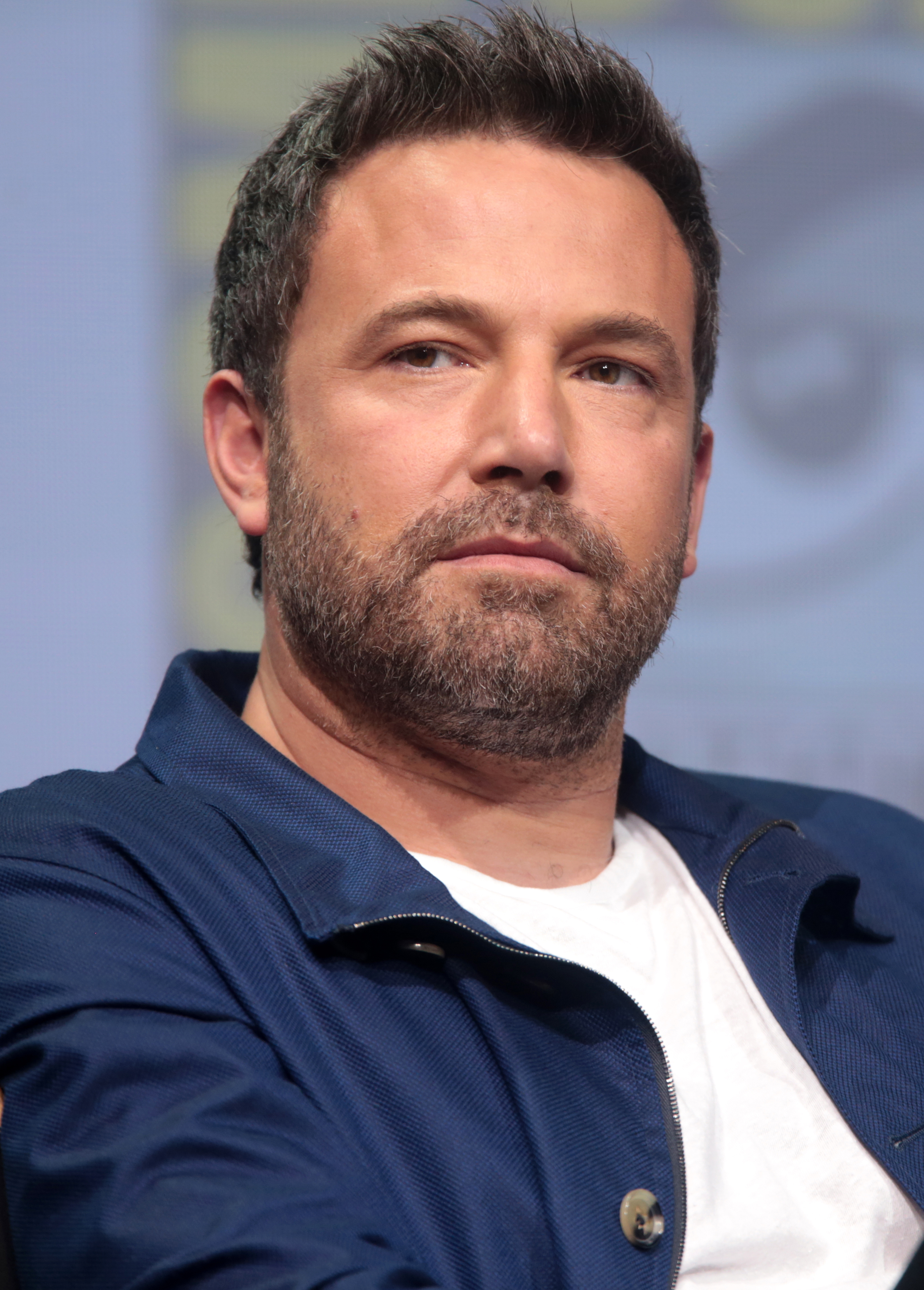
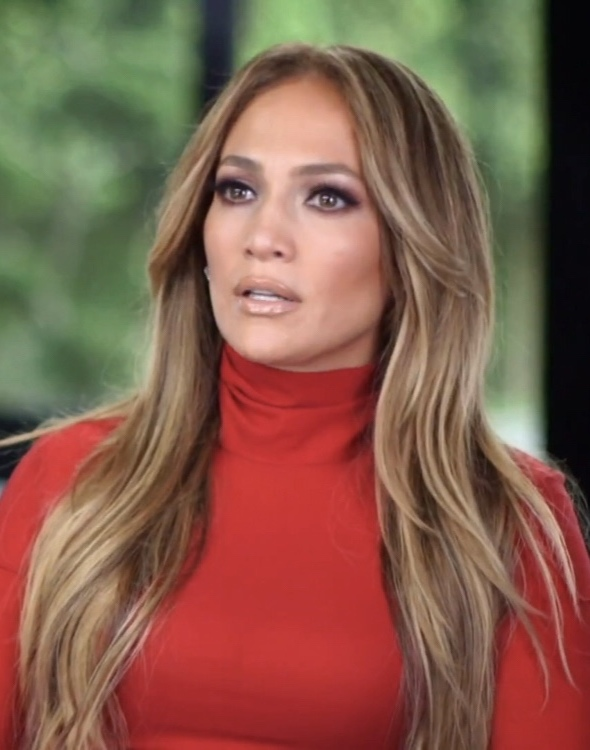
Ben Affleck (left) and Jennifer Lopez (right)

Halle Berry was originally attached to co-star opposite Ben Affleck, but Robey writes that she withdrew because of scheduling conflicts on X2. She was replaced by Jennifer Lopez, who signed on in late 2001 after her planned thriller Tick Tock was cancelled in the wake of 9/11. Variety reported that Lopez received $12 million for the film; Robey added that this was $500,000 less than Affleck's reported salary and that her deal also included back-end participation in the high single digits.

Principal photography took place in Los Angeles According to the film's production notes, the production used more than 20 Los Angeles locations as well as sound stages at Culver Studios, with Brest deliberately focusing on a less familiar, more dilapidated side of downtown Los Angeles The production notes also state that Gigli's apartment exterior was based on a Hollywood building, while the interior was constructed on a soundstage.

After early test screenings, Brest clashed with Roth over the film's pacing and final act. Robey writes that Brest's original ending was darker and more tragic, with Larry bleeding to death on the beach and Ricki revealed to have been posing as a contractor; Roth, alarmed by poor audience responses, pushed Brest into about five weeks of reshoots and a recut that compressed the criminal plot while emphasizing the romance. The Los Angeles Times also reported that Sony briefly considered renaming the film Tough Love because executives feared audiences would mispronounce Gigli.

According to later accounts by Brest and Affleck, the film was substantially reshaped after principal photography. Affleck said the studio, encouraged by tabloid fascination with his and Lopez's off-screen relationship, pushed the picture further toward a romance built around the pair. In a 2023 interview with Variety, Brest said "Extensive disagreements between the studio and myself got to the point where post-production was shut down for eight months while we battled it out. In the end I was left with two choices: quit or be complicit in the mangling of the movie. To my eternal regret I didn’t quit, so I bear responsibility for a ghastly cadaver of a movie. Once key scenes were cut it became like a joke with its punchline removed, endless contortions could never create the illusion that what remained was intended. Extensive reshooting and re-editing turned characters, scenes, story and tone upside down in the futile attempt to make the increasing mess resemble a movie. For the first time in my career I had become a true collaborator — not in the benign, creative sense, but rather that of one who, in violation of their true allegiances, cooperates with occupying forces. And for that kind of compromise, self-castigations far exceed any possible public ones."

== Release ==
=== Marketing ===
According to people involved in the film's release, Sony and Revolution struggled to market Gigli against "a tide of bad press", while the off-screen relationship between Affleck and Lopez became the picture's "greatest marketing liability". The film was briefly retitled Tough Love because executives feared audiences would mispronounce Gigli, although the original title was later restored.

Tim Robey wrote that the film's first poster foregrounded Affleck and Lopez as a romantic couple, while the trailer and other marketing materials omitted that Ricki was a lesbian. The Los Angeles Times reported that Sony and Revolution later tried to counter the tabloid focus by shifting the advertising toward the film's plot and away from its stars, but that strategy was quickly overshadowed by further coverage of the couple's relationship. After deciding against recruited or sneak-preview screenings, the studio instead mounted a last-minute publicity push that included around 60 junket interviews with the stars, a televised Pat O'Brien interview package, and promotional radio screenings in 75 cities.

=== Box office ===
Gigli was released in the United States and Canada on August 1, 2003. It grossed $3,753,518 from 2,215 theatres in its opening weekend, finishing eighth at the box office. Reporting on its debut, the Los Angeles Times described the result as a "commercial disaster", noting that it was the worst opening for a wide release starring Lopez since U-Turn and for Affleck since Phantoms.

In its second weekend, the film grossed $678,640, a 81.9% decline from its opening weekend. Box Office Mojo reported that Gigli held the record for the largest second-weekend drop for a wide release, until Undiscovered surpassed this mark in 2005. Robey wrote that by its third weekend the film had been dropped from 2,215 cinemas to just 73, a 97% loss of screens, which he described as a record at the time. It ended its theatrical run with $6,087,542 in the USA and Canada and $1,178,667 in other territories, for a worldwide total of $7,266,209 against a reported budget of $75.6 million.

Contemporary reporting attributed the film's weak commercial performance to negative pre-release publicity and the media attention surrounding Affleck and Lopez's off-screen relationship. Before the release, the Los Angeles Times reported that Sony and Revolution were struggling against "a tide of bad press" and that the stars' romance had become the film's "greatest marketing liability"; later that month, another Los Angeles Times report said the negative buzz around the film had "spiraled out of control" before opening. In October 2003, The Guardian reported that Sony Pictures attributed part of a $42 million third-quarter loss to the film's box-office performance.

== Reception ==
=== Critical response ===
Reviews were overwhelmingly negative. On the review aggregator website Rotten Tomatoes, 6% of 185 critics' reviews are positive. The website's consensus reads: "Bizarre and clumsily plotted, Gigli is a mess. As for its stars, Affleck and Lopez lack chemistry." Metacritic, which uses a weighted average, assigned the film a score of 18 out of 100, based on 37 critics, indicating "overwhelming dislike". Audiences polled by CinemaScore gave the film an average grade of "D−" on an A+ to F scale.

In the Los Angeles Times, Manohla Dargis called the film "nearly as unwatchable as it is unpronounceable", and wrote that it was built around jokes about "the disabled" and "switch-hitting lesbians". Writing in The Washington Post, Stephen Hunter called it "enervated, torpid, slack, dreary", and objected that Brian's disability was "played for chuckles and yuks". In Slant Magazine, Ed Gonzalez introduced the film as "Romantic comedy. Mob spoof. Dysfunctional family melodrama. Rain Man Redux", before dismissing it as "bizarre but inane".

Several critics also singled out the lead performances. Dargis wrote that Ben Affleck lacked "the chops or the charm" to get around the material, while Hunter said that Affleck and Jennifer Lopez had "very little electricity on-screen". Keith Phipps of The A.V. Club wrote that the stars had "charisma to spare", but said the film had "all the charge and momentum of a Paxil ad".

A minority of reviewers were more mixed. Roger Ebert gave the film two-and-a-half stars out of four and wrote that it tried "to do something different, thoughtful, and a little daring"; although he concluded that "the movie doesn't work", he praised parts of the dialogue and several of the supporting performances. In Variety, Amy Dawes was also relatively receptive, calling the film "an enjoyably written and performed romantic comedy", though she suggested that the publicity surrounding Affleck and Lopez would make it difficult to judge on its own terms.

=== Accolades ===
Award	Ceremony date	Category	Subject	Result
Golden Raspberry Awards	February 28, 2004	Worst Picture	Columbia/Revolution Studios	Won
Golden Raspberry Awards	February 28, 2004	Worst Actor	Ben Affleck, also for Daredevil and Paycheck	Won
Golden Raspberry Awards	February 28, 2004	Worst Actress	Jennifer Lopez	Won
Golden Raspberry Awards	February 28, 2004	Worst Supporting Actor	Al Pacino	Nominated
Golden Raspberry Awards	February 28, 2004	Worst Supporting Actor	Christopher Walken, also for Kangaroo Jack	Nominated
Golden Raspberry Awards	February 28, 2004	Worst Supporting Actress	Lainie Kazan	Nominated
Golden Raspberry Awards	February 28, 2004	Worst Screen Couple	Ben Affleck and Jennifer Lopez	Won
Golden Raspberry Awards	February 28, 2004	Worst Director	Martin Brest	Won
Golden Raspberry Awards	February 28, 2004	Worst Screenplay	Martin Brest	Won
Golden Raspberry Awards	February 26, 2005	Worst "Comedy" of Our First 25 Years		Won
Golden Raspberry Awards	March 6, 2010	Worst Picture of the Decade		Nominated
Stinkers Bad Movie Awards	February 22, 2004	Worst Film		Nominated
Stinkers Bad Movie Awards	February 22, 2004	Worst Actor	Ben Affleck, also for Daredevil and Paycheck	Won
Stinkers Bad Movie Awards	February 22, 2004	Worst Fake Accent – Male	Ben Affleck	Won
Stinkers Bad Movie Awards	February 22, 2004	Worst Actress	Jennifer Lopez	Won
Stinkers Bad Movie Awards	February 22, 2004	Worst Fake Accent – Female	Jennifer Lopez	Won
Stinkers Bad Movie Awards	February 22, 2004	Worst On-Screen Couple	Ben Affleck and Jennifer Lopez	Won
Stinkers Bad Movie Awards	February 22, 2004	Worst Supporting Actor	Justin Bartha	Nominated
Stinkers Bad Movie Awards	February 22, 2004	Worst Supporting Actress	Lainie Kazan	Nominated
Stinkers Bad Movie Awards	February 22, 2004	Most Intrusive Musical Score		Nominated
Stinkers Bad Movie Awards	February 22, 2004	Worst Sense of Direction	Martin Brest	Nominated
Stinkers Bad Movie Awards	February 22, 2004	Worst Song	"Baby Got Back"	Nominated

== Aftermath ==
After its release, Gigli came to be treated as a symbol of high-profile Hollywood failure. In 2013, the Los Angeles Times called it "almost industry shorthand for commercial and critical ignominy", while Jason Bailey wrote in The Guardian in 2021 that the title had become "a shorthand for embarrassing flops". Writing in Box Office Poison, Tim Robey described Gigli as "the most notorious bomb of its day", arguing that the film exemplified the "inflated dealmaking of the early 2000s". In 2024, Affleck similarly described Gigli as "the most famous bomb in history, perhaps".

Much of the film's afterlife has been inseparable from the celebrity phenomenon of "Bennifer". Bailey argued that, by the time the film reached cinemas, backlash against Affleck and Lopez had already "built up quite a head of steam". Robey likewise wrote that the pair's overexposure became the film's "worst enemy" apart from the film itself, and that Gigli had come to look like "Bennifer: The Movie". Film scholars Alan Dodd and Martin Fradley similarly wrote that Lopez and Affleck's two-year relationship became the subject of intense media attention, and that when the couple broke up in early 2004 they publicly blamed excessive press scrutiny.

Robey also argued that the film's notoriety persisted because of elements beyond its commercial failure, particularly what he called its "patronizingly twee" treatment of intellectual disability and the "especially toxic" way it handled Ricki's lesbianism before ultimately pairing her with Larry. Dodd and Fradley likewise described Gigli as a "misjudged vanity project" and summarized it as a romantic crime caper in which Lopez plays a lesbian "improbably converted to heterosexuality" by Affleck's character. Those aspects have continued to figure in retrospective criticism alongside the film's dialogue.

The film's failure also affected the marketing of the pair's next collaboration, Jersey Girl. Bailey wrote that the film's "lingering odor" was so strong that advertising for the later film omitted Lopez, while Robey similarly wrote that Miramax and Kevin Smith reduced her visibility in the campaign, including removing her from the trailer, amid fears that audiences would expect "another Gigli".

The fallout also shaped the careers of the film's principals. Affleck later said that the reaction to Gigli pushed him toward directing, which became "the real love of [his] professional life". In 2015, he received the Golden Raspberry Awards' inaugural "Redeemer Award", which contemporary coverage described as recognizing his move from Gigli to the later success of Argo and Gone Girl. Lopez described the period as a personal and professional low point. In a 2017 interview with Vanity Fair, she said she had been "eviscerated", had "lost [her] sense of self", and felt that her relationship with Affleck had "self-destructed in front of the entire world". Dodd and Fradley argued that Lopez's next starring vehicle, Shall We Dance?, functioned as a relatively low-key "recuperative performance" designed to repair the gap between the pleasures of Lopez's romantic-comedy persona and the damage done to her public image by the failures of Gigli and "Bennifer". Robey wrote that Affleck and Lopez were eventually able to reposition themselves, but that the same could not be said for Martin Brest, whose directing career was effectively halted by Gigli. Brest has not directed another feature film to date, and in a 2023 interview he described the released film as "a bloody mess that deserved its excoriation".

== See also ==
- List of 21st century films considered the worst
- List of biggest box-office bombs

== Bibliography ==
- Dodd, Alan; Fradley, Martin (2009). "'I Believe that if I Haven't Found my Prince Charming Already, that I Will; or he Will Find me, if he Hasn't Already': Jennifer Lopez, Romantic Comedy and Contemporary Stardom". In Abbott, Stacey; Jermyn, Deborah (eds.). Falling in Love Again: Romantic Comedy in Contemporary Cinema. London: I.B. Tauris. pp. 190–207. ISBN 978-1-84511-771-9.
- Robey, Tim (2024). Box Office Poison: Hollywood's Story in a Century of Flops. Hanover Square Press. ISBN 978-0-369-76084-5.
