= Robert Iscove =

Canadian director, producer and choreographer

- Born: 4 June 1947 (age 79); Toronto, Ontario, Canada
- Education: Juilliard School
- Occupations: Film and television director, producer, choreographer, dancer

Robert Iscove (born July 4, 1947) is a Canadian television and film director, producer and choreographer. He is a two-time Primetime Emmy Award nominee, Outstanding Choreography for the special Ann-Margret Smith (1976) and Outstanding Directing for a Variety or Musical Program for Cinderella (1997).

== Early life and education ==
Born in Toronto, Iscove studied dance at the Juilliard School and began his choreographing career as an assistant to Michael Bennett.

== Career ==
=== Choreographer ===
He made his Broadway debut in the cast of the 1967 musical Henry, Sweet Henry, which Bennett choreographed. Iscove's first feature film work was as choreographer for the 1973 film version of Jesus Christ Superstar.

He subsequently worked on several variety and musical television specials, earning a Primetime Emmy nomination for Outstanding Choreography for Ann-Margret Smith. He was also lead choreographer for the 50th Academy Awards.

=== Director ===
After directing musical specials, Iscove directed episodes of 1980s television series like Philip Marlowe, Private Eye, Alfred Hitchcock Presents, Faerie Tale Theatre, Star Trek: The Next Generation, Miami Vice, 21 Jump Street, and Wiseguy. During the following decade he helmed numerous television films and miniseries, including 1997's Cinderella, which earned him a second Primetime Emmy nomination.

He made his feature directorial debut with 1999's She's All That. He directed 2003's From Justin to Kelly, a star vehicle for American Idol contestants Kelly Clarkson and Justin Guarini, which was critically panned and nominated for eight Razzie Awards.

Iscove was an uncredited co-director of the animated film Wonder Park, helping finish the film after original director Dylan Brown was fired late into production.

== Partial filmography ==
=== Film ===
- She's All That (1999)
- Boys and Girls (2000)
- From Justin to Kelly (2003)
- Love N' Dancing (2009)
- Wonder Park (2019, uncredited)

=== Television ===
==== TV movies and miniseries ====
1984 Faerie Tale Theatre The Little Mermaid Director

- Chautauqua Girl (1984)
- Love and Larceny (1985)
- The Lawrenceville Stories (1987-1989)
- Shattered Dreams (1990)
- The Flash (1990)
- Mission of the Shark (1991)
- Breaking the Silence (1992)
- Without Warning (1994)
- Cinderella (1997)
- Firestarter: Rekindled (2002)
- The Ten Commandments: The Musical (2004)
- Spectacular! (2009)
- Whiskey Business (2012)
