= List of LGBTQ-related films of the 2000s =

LGBTQ-related films released in the 2000s are listed in the following articles:

- List of LGBTQ-related films of 2000
- List of LGBTQ-related films of 2001
- List of LGBTQ-related films of 2002
- List of LGBTQ-related films of 2003
- List of LGBTQ-related films of 2004
- List of LGBTQ-related films of 2005
- List of LGBTQ-related films of 2006
- List of LGBTQ-related films of 2007
- List of LGBTQ-related films of 2008
- List of LGBTQ-related films of 2009
