= Bennifer =

Romance between Ben Affleck and Jennifer Lopez

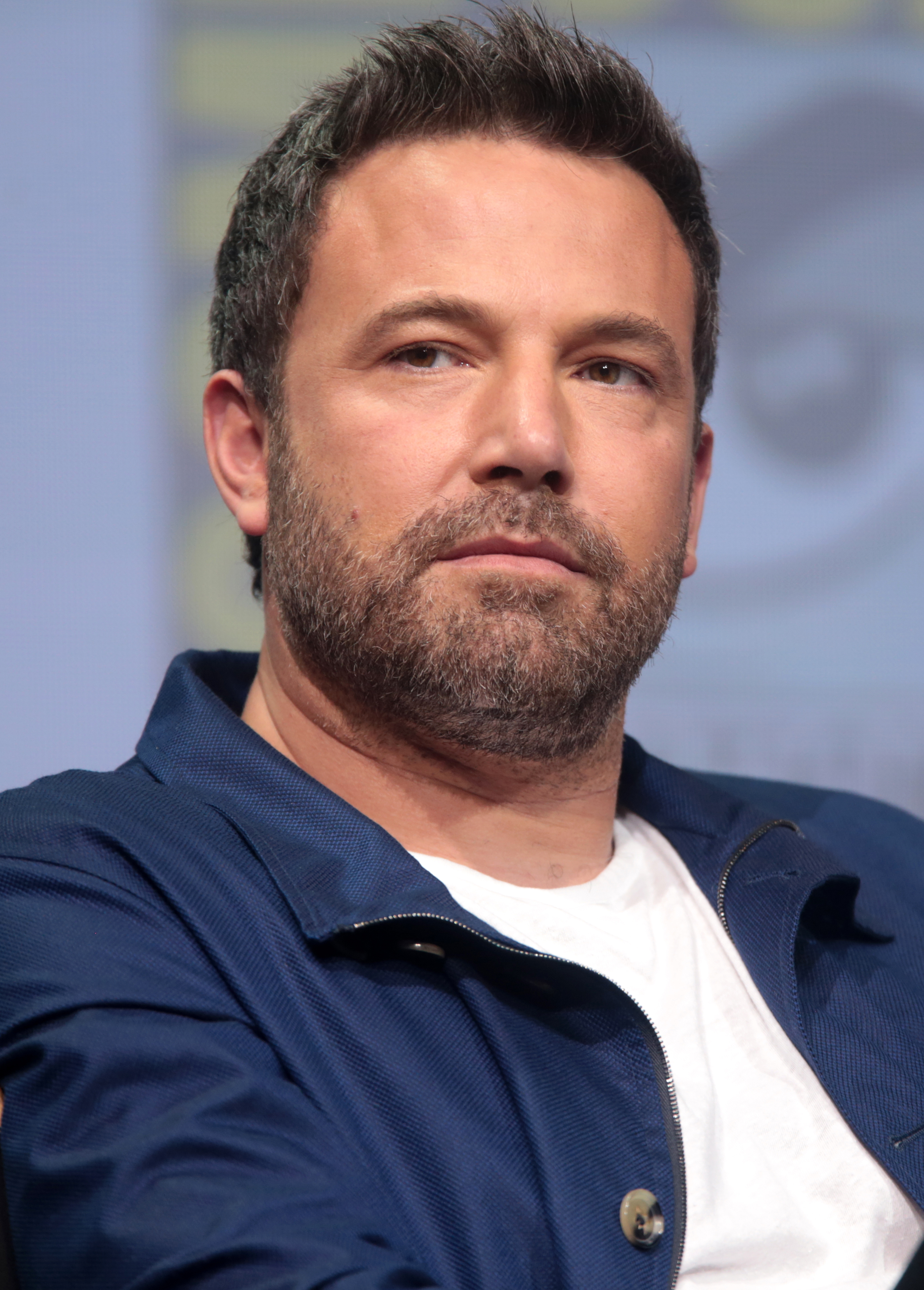
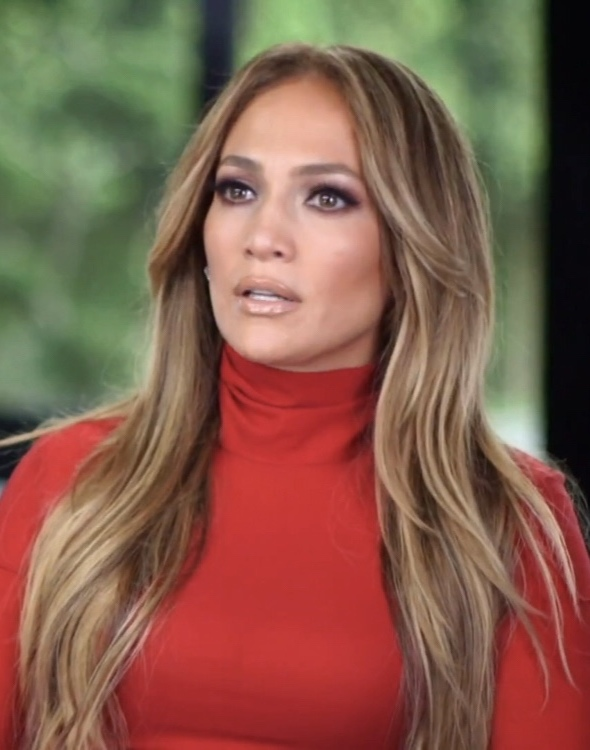
Ben Affleck (left) and Jennifer Lopez (right)

Bennifer is the nickname given by the media to the high-profile relationship between American actor and filmmaker Ben Affleck and American singer and actress Jennifer Lopez. The pair had a widely publicized 18-month romance from 2002 to 2004, and were engaged to be married. After their breakup, they maintained a friendship. They rekindled their romantic relationship in early 2021 and married in July 2022. During their second relationship, the nickname Bennifer 2.0 was sometimes used. However, Lopez filed for divorce after only two years, on August 20, 2024. They have starred in two films together, Gigli (2003) and Jersey Girl (2004), and appeared in two music videos together, "Jenny from the Block" (2002) and "Marry Me" (ballad version) (2022).

== Initial relationship ==
=== Early stages ===
Although they had crossed paths several times before (most notably at the 70th Academy Awards and at the premiere of Armageddon, both in 1998), the first major meeting of Affleck and Lopez took place in late 2001 on the set of their film Gigli while Lopez was still married to Cris Judd. It was rumored by the tabloids that the pair had started an affair due to their friendly and flirty ways, but they both denied these claims, stating that they were just friends. After wrapping filming for the movie in March 2002, Affleck had spent a reported $18,000 on a set of half-page advertisements to express the pleasure he had working with Lopez. He had defended his reasoning for doing so, citing that he had been ashamed of his "preconceived notions" of Lopez. Later that April, it was reported that Affleck and Lopez were "cozying up" during the opening of her restaurant Madre's. Lopez and Judd separated that summer and Lopez entered a relationship with Affleck. They were photographed together in July 2002.

=== Engagement and romance ===
Lopez and Affleck's relationship garnered the first couple portmanteau name in Hollywood, "Bennifer". Lopez's single "Jenny from the Block", which featured Affleck in the music video, brought on even more attention to the couple, with Lopez describing it as a tabloid frenzy. After three months of dating, Affleck proposed to Lopez at his mother's home in October 2002 with a $1.2m 6.1-carat Harry Winston pink diamond ring. Later that month, Affleck and Lopez began filming their second film together, Jersey Girl. Lopez dedicated her 2002 album This Is Me... Then to Affleck, stating that he was "her life and sole inspiration for every lyric. She included songs such as "Baby I Love U!", "I'm Glad" and "Dear Ben", which were about her romance with Affleck. On July 18, 2003, Lopez and Affleck had their first primetime interview together on Dateline NBC. On August 1, 2003, Lopez and Affleck's box-office bomb film Gigli released, which is considered one of the worst films in history. After this happened, the media started to portray them in a more negative manner. As Jason Bailey in a piece for the Guardian observed: "it's important to frame this ghastly reception within the atmosphere of the moment. Affleck and Lopez met during the film’s production and quickly became an item – such a public one that, by the time it hit theaters a year later, the “Bennifer” backlash had built up quite a head of steam. They were young, impossibly good-looking, fabulously wealthy, and clearly hot for each other, so it seemed like a good time to knock them down a peg." Lopez had described the experience as overwhelming, and she stated that Affleck hated the attention the pair was getting. The following month, the couple postponed their planned September 2003 wedding just days before it was set to take place due to "excessive media attention".

=== Breakup ===
The pair continued dating for four months before deciding to separate. The former couple's second movie, Jersey Girl, premiered two months later in March 2004, garnering another box-office bomb for the pair. Affleck and Lopez remained in contact in the years after their breakup and spoke highly of each other in public. Affleck called out "sexist and racist" critics for comments about Lopez, while Lopez cited the constant media attention as one of the main reasons of their breakup. In 2008, Affleck discussed how he felt during his relationship with Lopez, saying that neither of them "anticipated" the degree of attention they would receive, saying: "we fell in love, we were excited and maybe too accessible," but pushed back against the "curious notion" that he should view the relationship as a mistake, and reflected on the prevailing tabloid culture at the time "where it's about one person and everybody focuses on them." Lopez has seconded Affleck's words, saying that the media coverage destroyed their relationship "from the inside out" and that she felt “eviscerated“ by it. In 2014, Lopez expressed that her breakup with Affleck was her "first real heartbreak," and in 2015 she stated she had "no regrets" about their relationship. In early 2021, Affleck praised Lopez for her work ethic, great talent, and success.

=== Aftermath ===
Soon after the pair split, Lopez married singer Marc Anthony. Affleck married actress Jennifer Garner in 2005.

Lopez and Anthony ended their seven-year marriage in 2011, officially divorcing in 2014, while Affleck and Garner announced their split in 2015, finalizing their divorce in 2018.

== Rekindled romance ==
In May 2021, shortly after Jennifer Lopez’s split from Alex Rodriguez, she and Ben Affleck sparked reunion rumors with a trip to Montana. Over the summer, they were spotted together at family gatherings and vacations. By September, they attended the Met Gala as a couple, making their relationship public once again. Affleck and Lopez were photographed together for the first time since their initial romance on May 11, 2021. On May 24, 2021, Lopez and Affleck were spotted at Lopez's rental home in Miami with Affleck wearing the watch Lopez had given him in her 2002 "Jenny From The Block" music video. On June 1, 2021, Affleck and Lopez were photographed holding each other, their first public display of affection in their rekindled romance. On June 14, 2021, photos and videos of Affleck and Lopez kissing were released to the media for the first time in almost two decades, confirming that their romance was back on. Lopez publicly confirmed their rekindled relationship that July, while they were on vacation in France and Italy. On September 10, 2021, the couple had made their red carpet debut for the first time in 18 years for the premiere of Affleck's film The Last Duel during the Venice Film Festival in Italy. Both Affleck and Lopez have spoken of the gift of a second chance with each other since reuniting. For Valentine's Day, Affleck directed and gifted to Lopez, shared through her OntheJLo Email, a remix of her song "On My Way". He also made his second cameo appearance in an official Lopez music video: "Marry Me" (Ballad Version).

Lopez announced on April 8, 2022, that the pair were engaged again, 20 years after the first proposal. The couple married on July 16, 2022, filing their marriage license in Las Vegas. Lopez legally changed her name to Jennifer Affleck and confirmed the marriage the next day. The following month, they held a wedding celebration for family and friends.

In June 2024, the couple faced intense scrutiny over the state of their marriage when divorce rumors circulated online. In August 2024, Lopez filed for divorce from Affleck on their second wedding anniversary. The divorce was settled around four months later.

== See also ==
- Supercouple
