= Kangaroo Jack =

2003 film by David McNally

- Theatrical release poster
- Directed by: David McNally
- Screenplay by: Steve Bing; Scott Rosenberg
- Story by: Steve Bing; Barry O'Brien
- Produced by: Jerry Bruckheimer
- Starring: Jerry O'Connell; Anthony Anderson; Estella Warren; Michael Shannon; Christopher Walken
- Cinematography: Peter Menzies Jr.
- Edited by: John Murray; William Goldenberg; Jim May
- Music by: Trevor Rabin
- Production companies: Castle Rock Entertainment; Jerry Bruckheimer Films
- Distributed by: Warner Bros. Pictures (through Roadshow Entertainment in Australia)
- Release date: January 17, 2003 (United States)
- Running time: 89 minutes
- Countries: United States; Australia
- Language: English
- Budget: $60 million
- Box office: $90.5 million

Kangaroo Jack is a 2003 buddy action comedy film, directed by David McNally, and written by Steve Bing and Scott Rosenberg. The film stars Jerry O'Connell and Anthony Anderson as two childhood friends who get caught up with the mob and are forced to deliver $50,000 to Australia, but things go haywire when the money is lost to a wild kangaroo. Supporting cast members include Estella Warren, Michael Shannon, and Christopher Walken. The score was composed by Trevor Rabin.

Originally conceived as an R-rated mob comedy entitled Down and Under, negative test screenings led producer Jerry Bruckheimer to retool the film into a PG-rated film, heavily re-editing the film and adding scenes of an anthropomorphic kangaroo.

Kangaroo Jack was produced by Castle Rock Entertainment and Jerry Bruckheimer Films and released in the United States on January 17, 2003, by Warner Bros. Pictures. The film received overwhelmingly negative reviews by critics, with many lambasting the movie for its story, raunchy humor and deceptive marketing. It would gross over $90 million worldwide against a $60 million budget.

An animated direct-to-video sequel, Kangaroo Jack: G'Day U.S.A.!, was released in 2004.

== Plot ==
In 1982 Brooklyn, a boy named Charlie Carbone is about to become the stepson of mobster Salvatore Maggio. Charlie nearly drowns while at the beach, but a boy named Louis Booker saves him, and they become best friends.

20 years later, Charlie operates a beauty salon set up by Sal, whose henchmen take 80% of the profits, barely leaving Charlie enough money for maintenance. After Charlie and Louis botch hiding some stolen TVs, which leads to the discovery of Sal's warehouse by the police, Sal gives them one more chance. Under instructions from Sal's apprentice Frankie Lombardo, they are to deliver a package to a man named Mr. Smith in Coober Pedy, Australia. Frankie also warns them against opening the package, and provides them with Mr. Smith's number. Unknown to the duo, Sal has cancelled their return trip. Louis opens the package on the plane and finds $50,000 cash.

Arriving in Australia, Charlie and Louis drive to Coober Pedy. Along their way, they accidentally run over a red kangaroo. Louis thinks it is dead and calls the kangaroo “Jackie Legs”, after their friend from Canarsie. Louis even puts his “lucky” jacket and sunglasses on the kangaroo, posing for photographs as a joke. The kangaroo suddenly regains consciousness, kicks Charlie, and hops away with the $50,000 in the jacket. Charlie and Louis give chase but crash their rental car, and the kangaroo escapes.

At a pub in Alice Springs, Louis calls Mr. Smith, who thinks he and Charlie stole his package and threatens to kill them by feeding them to the crocodiles. Back in New York, Sal gets a call from Smith complaining that Charlie and Louis have not arrived, then sends Frankie and some henchmen to Australia to investigate. Meanwhile, Charlie and Louis attempt to reclaim the money from the kangaroo by shooting it with a tranquilizer from a plane. The attempt fails when Louis accidentally shoots Blue, the pilot, causing the plane to crash and stranding the duo in the desert. They spend hours wandering in the desert, during which the duo encounter a pack of hungry dingoes and a sand storm, and Charlie hallucinates finding a jeep, and they soon meet Jessie, an American woman from the Outback Wildlife Foundation. Charlie, thinking she is a mirage, sexually harasses her and she knocks him out. Charlie then has a dream with a speaking and rapping version of the kangaroo, plus two other kangaroos possessing Sal and Louis's voices, who taunt him by calling him "Chicken Blood" repeatedly.

The following day, the three track Jackie Legs to the Todd River, attempting to catch the animal with bolas, but Louis accidentally botches their attempt when he panics after ants crawl up his pants. While waiting for the next opportunity to catch the kangaroo, Charlie begins developing feelings for Jessie. At the crack of dawn the following day, Smith and his henchmen shortly arrive, after following their camel tracks, and capture the trio. Charlie and Louis outsmart them, but find Frankie has tracked them down and is prepared to kill them. Jackie Legs suddenly returns, causing a fist fight between Smith's henchmen and Frankie's crew, who outmatch them. The distraction allows Charlie, Louis and Jessie to escape. The duo chases after the kangaroo while being pursued by Frankie and his goons. Louis finally retrieves the money from the kangaroo, and Charlie narrowly saves him from falling off a cliff. Charlie tries to hand the money to Frankie, who angrily declines and reveals that Sal sent them to Australia to pay for their own execution at the hands of Smith. As he is about to shoot Charlie, the Australian Federal Police force, led by a cop working undercover as an Outback guide, arrives and arrests Frankie, Smith, and their henchmen. Charlie reclaims Louis's jacket from the kangaroo.

One year later, Charlie and Jessie are married and have used Sal's $50,000 to start a line of new hair care products bearing a kangaroo logo, along with Louis. Frankie and his goons have been imprisoned for life, a fate Sal has also failed to avoid, and he is now awaiting trial. Jackie Legs, now called "Kangaroo Jack", continues to live happily in the Outback. Now able to speak again, Jackie breaks the fourth wall, explaining why the film should end with him since it is named after him, and finally closes it with his version of Porky Pig's famous catchphrase: "That's all, blokes!"

== Cast ==
- Jerry O'Connell as Charlie Carbone, the owner of a beauty salon.
  - Robert Reid as young Charlie Carbone
- Anthony Anderson as Louis Booker, Charlie's best friend. Anderson also voices his kangaroo counterpart in Charlie's nightmare.
  - Shawn Smith as young Louis Booker
- Estella Warren as Jessie, a member of the Outback Wildlife Foundation who helps Charlie and Louis and later becomes Charlie's wife.
- Christopher Walken as Sal Maggio, a mobster and Charlie's stepfather. Walken also voices his kangaroo counterpart in Charlie's nightmare.
- Dyan Cannon as Anna Carbone, Charlie's mother
- Michael Shannon as Frankie Lombardo, Sal's apprentice
  - Brian Casey as young Frankie Lombardo
- Adam Garcia as Kangaroo Jack / "Jackie Legs" (voice, uncredited), a red kangaroo on whom Louis puts his "lucky jacket".
  - Frank Welker as Jack's Vocal Effects
- Marton Csokas as Mr. Smith, the intended recipient of Charlie and Louis's $50,000 package.
- Bill Hunter as Blue, a pilot whom Charlie and Louis enlist to help catch Jack.
- Tony Nikolakopoulos as Sal's Capo, an unnamed caporegime who works for Sal.
- David Ngoombujarra as Sergeant Jimmy Inkamale, an Australian Police officer who works undercover.
- Christopher James Baker as Crumble
- Damien Fotiou as Baby J
- Denise Roberts as Tansy
- Lara Cox as Cute Girl on Plane
- Helen Thomson as TV announcer
- Mario Di Ienno as Tommy

== Production ==
Initially Kangaroo Jack was titled Down and Under and was shot as a mob comedy in the style of Midnight Run. The film was initially set up at the Disney label Hollywood Pictures, but Disney placed it into turnaround and instead the film was set up at Castle Rock Entertainment. The film began shooting in Australia in August 2001, lasting about six months in total, and originally included profanity, sex, and violence, intended to be released with an R-rating. According to actor Jerry O'Connell, he filmed a full-frontal nude scene for the film. However, the film's producers were dissatisfied by the first rough cut.

Inspired by positive response to the kangaroo scene in early test screenings, as well as the marketing campaign behind the recently released Snow Dogs, the production shifted the marketing focus away from that of a dark mafia comedy to that of a family-friendly animal picture. New footage featuring more gags with the CGI kangaroo was shot, and the film was edited down to a PG-rated family animal comedy. Among the changes, repeated utterances of "chickenshit" were redubbed with "chicken blood".

== Release ==
=== Theatrical release ===
Kangaroo Jack was theatrically released on January 17, 2003, by Warner Bros. Pictures.

== Reception ==
=== Box office ===
Kangaroo Jack earned $16.5 million on its opening weekend and grossed $66.7 million in the United States and Canada and $23.8 million internationally for a worldwide total of $90.5 million.

=== Critical response ===
On the review aggregator website Rotten Tomatoes, 9% of 115 critics' reviews are positive, with an average rating of 3.4/10. The website's consensus reads: "The humor is gratingly dumb, and Kangaroo Jack contains too much violence and sexual innuendo for a family movie." Metacritic, which uses a weighted average, assigned the film a score of 16 out of 100, based on 25 critics, indicating "overwhelming dislike". Audiences polled by CinemaScore gave the film an average grade of "A−" on an A+ to F scale.

Joe McGovern in The Village Voice described Kangaroo Jack as "witless" and stated "The colorless script...seems to have written itself from a patchwork of Wile E. Coyote cartoons, camel farts, and every high-pitched Aussie cliché to have echoed on these shores". Nathan Rabin, reviewing the film for The A.V. Club, criticized the false advertising that the kangaroo would have a major role in the story and speak throughout, remarking, "Kangaroo Jack's premise, trailer, and commercials promise little more than the spectacle of two enthusiastic actors being kicked over and over again by a sassy, computer-animated kangaroo—and, sadly, the film fails to deliver even that." Gary Slaymaker in the British newspaper The Western Mail wrote "Kangaroo Jack is the most witless, pointless, charmless drivel unleashed on an unsuspecting public".

=== Awards and nominations ===
For their performances, Anthony Anderson and Christopher Walken were both nominated for Worst Supporting Actor at the 24th Golden Raspberry Awards, but they lost to Sylvester Stallone for Spy Kids 3-D: Game Over. The Australian newspaper The Age included Kangaroo Jack on its list of "worst films ever made". However, the film won the Kids' Choice Award for Favorite Fart in a Movie (Anthony Anderson).

Award	Year	Category	Nominee	Result
Kids' Choice Award	2004	Favorite Fart in a Movie	Anthony Anderson	Won
MTV Movie Award	2003	Best Virtual Performance	"Kangaroo Jack"	Nominated
Razzie Award	2004	Worst Supporting Actor	Christopher Walken	Nominated
Razzie Award	2004	Worst Supporting Actor	Anthony Anderson	Nominated
Teen Choice Award	2003	Choice Movie Actor - Comedy	Anthony Anderson	Nominated
Stinkers Bad Movie Awards	2003	Worst Supporting Actress	Estella Warren	Nominated
Stinkers Bad Movie Awards	2003	Most Painfully Unfunny Comedy		Nominated
Stinkers Bad Movie Awards	2003	Least "Special" Special Effects		Nominated
Stinkers Bad Movie Awards	2003	Most Annoying Non-Human Character	Kangaroo Jack	Nominated

== Soundtrack ==
The soundtrack was released by Hip-O Records on January 14, 2003.

1. DJ Ötzi – "Hey Baby"
2. Sugababes – "Round Round"
3. Soft Cell – "Tainted Love"
4. Lucia – "So Clever"
5. Paulina Rubio – "Casanova"
6. Shaggy – "Hey Sexy Lady"
7. Shawn Desman – "Spread My Wings"
8. Lil' Romeo – "2-Way"
9. The Wiseguys – "Start the Commotion"
10. The Sugarhill Gang – "Rapper's Delight"
11. Colin Hay – "Down Under"
12. The Dude – "Rock Da Juice"

== Animated sequel ==
An animated sequel titled Kangaroo Jack: G'Day U.S.A.!, was released direct-to-video on November 16, 2004. It was produced by Warner Bros. Animation and Castle Rock Entertainment, but without the involvement of Jerry Bruckheimer Films.
