= Justin Guarini =

American singer (born 1978)

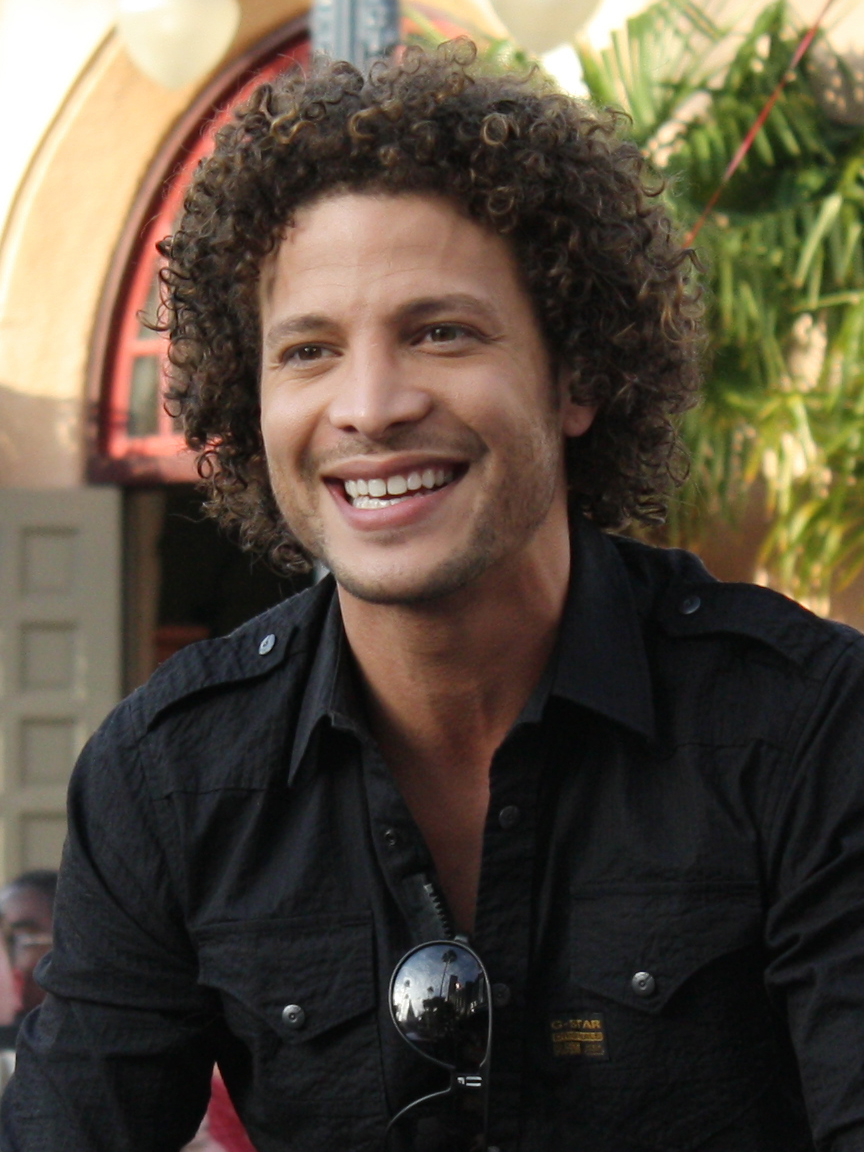
- Guarini in 2009

Background information
- Born: Justin Eldrin Bell; October 28, 1978 (age 48); Columbus, Georgia, U.S.
- Origin: Doylestown, Pennsylvania
- Genre: Jazz
- Occupations: Singer-songwriter; actor; television host
- Years active: 2002–present
- Labels: RCA; Justice Entertainment
- Spouse: Reina Guarini (m. 2009; div. 2025)
- Website: justinguarini.com

Justin Guarini (born Justin Eldrin Bell; October 28, 1978) is an American singer, songwriter and actor who in 2002 was the runner-up on the first season of American Idol.

== Early life ==
Guarini was born in Columbus, Georgia. His father, Eldrin Bell, is African-American and is the former Chief of Police of Atlanta, and former chairperson of the Clayton County Commission in Clayton County, Georgia. His mother, Kathy Pepino Guarini, is Italian American, and was a journalist for WTVM TV in Columbus, and later for CNN. Guarini was primarily raised by his mother and stepfather, physicist Jerry Guarini, in the Philadelphia suburb of Doylestown, Pennsylvania. He attended Central Bucks High School East.

== Career ==
=== Beginnings ===
Guarini's musical experience started at age four when he was accepted by the Atlanta Boy Choir. After moving to Pennsylvania in 1985, he joined the Archdiocese of Philadelphia Boys Choir. Throughout his school years Guarini sang in school choirs, and from 1996 to 2000 was the lead soloist in an award-winning a cappella group named The Midnight Voices. The group released an independent album in 1999 with proceeds benefiting a music scholarship fund at Guarini's alma mater, Central Bucks High School East in Buckingham, Pennsylvania. He was a director/performer at the Riverside Haunted Woods in Bridgeton Township, Pennsylvania, in 2001.

His high school and college theatre credits include the lead roles in The Mystery of Edwin Drood, The Little Prince, The Pirates of Penzance, The Taming of the Shrew, and Once on This Island. In addition to singing and stage performing, Guarini plays the piano, guitar, and banjo.

After studying vocal performance and theater studies at the University of the Arts in Philadelphia, Guarini later moved to New York City, where he attended the School for Film and Television. He worked in New York nightclubs, and auditioned for New York Theatre before successfully auditioning for American Idol in April 2002. Shortly after being chosen for American Idol, he was offered a role in the Broadway production of The Lion King. Guarini wrote about his decision between the two offers in his exclusive 2008 blog for the television site, Fancast, stating, "I had attended master classes… I learned Zulu and Sotho phrases, as well as the music from the show. It was a dream almost come true at the time. But, now I knew I was onto something, and I wasn't letting go. I politely declined the offer of a role...". He was also considering a contract offer from an independent record label, but the show's rules prohibited participants from having existing record contracts.

=== American Idol ===
Idol judge Simon Cowell praised Guarini's performance in the show's first season, at one early audition telling him "Justin, you know, occasionally you're very privileged when you do a competition like this to hear somebody undiscovered who has a voice like yours", with Guarini ultimately becoming the runner-up to winner Kelly Clarkson in September 2002. Soon after, Guarini signed with American Idol's 19 Management and secured a record deal with RCA. Prior to the American Idol Tour, he was the only contestant asked to appear on The Oprah Winfrey Show, on which Oprah Winfrey told him, "Justin, you have it."

==== American Idol performances ====
Week	Theme	Song Sung	Artist	Order	Result
Top 30	Semi-final Group 2	"Ribbon in the Sky"	Stevie Wonder	10	Advanced
Top 10	Motown	"For Once in My Life"	Stevie Wonder	6	Safe
Top 8	1960s	"Sunny"	Bobby Hebb	7	Safe
Top 7	1970s	"Someday We'll All Be Free"	Donny Hathaway	4	Bottom 2
Top 6	Big Band	"Route 66"	Nat King Cole	2	Safe
Top 5	Burt Bacharach Love Songs	"The Look of Love"	Dusty Springfield	4	Safe
Top 4	1980s 1990s	"P.Y.T. (Pretty Young Thing)" "Get Here"	Michael Jackson; Brenda Russell	4; 8	Safe
Top 3	Idol's Choice; Judges' Choice	"Let's Stay Together" "Don't Let the Sun Go Down on Me"	Al Green; Elton John	2; 5	Safe
Top 2	Finale	"Before Your Love" "Get Here" "A Moment Like This"	Justin Guarini; Oleta Adams; Justin Guarini	1; 3; 5	Runner-up

=== 2003–2004: Justin Guarini ===
His eponymous album debuted in June 2003, coinciding with the single releases of the current second season American Idol top two finalists and the movie From Justin to Kelly, in which Guarini co-starred with Kelly Clarkson. The film was critically panned, while the album sold 146,000 copies. In December 2003 Guarini was dropped from RCA Records.

Guarini had a role in the 2004 pre-Broadway New York Stage and Film Powerhouse Theater workshop/presentation of the musical Good Vibrations at Vassar College. His performance (which included singing, dancing, acting, and playing guitar) landed Guarini an offer to continue the role in the original Broadway production, which he eventually declined.

=== 2005–2007: Stranger Things Have Happened ===
Guarini co-produced his second album Stranger Things Have Happened, independently released in December 2005 through his own production company, Justice Entertainment, Ltd.. The album of reinvented jazz standards was described by Allmusic as "a successful reinvention... where his natural skills shine", The Philadelphia Inquirer said that "Guarini displays an agile, attractive voice with good phrasing, supported by a sophisticated and funky backing ensemble."

Guarini wrote, co-arranged and recorded a benefit song released with H.H. Gayuna Cealo, and a song for the documentary series Project Everlasting, in August 2006 and featured on the Today Show. The title track from his album Stranger Things Have Happened was also used in the documentary.

From 2007 to 2011, TV Guide Network signed Guarini as permanent co-host for Idol Wrap and Idol Tonight. On-air duties with the network expanded to include guest hosting/appearances on other TV Guide Network shows, hosting movie premiere specials, and serving as a member of TV Guide Network's awards show team with on-air coverage of awards shows such as the Grammy Awards and Emmy Awards.

=== 2008–2009: Revolve ===
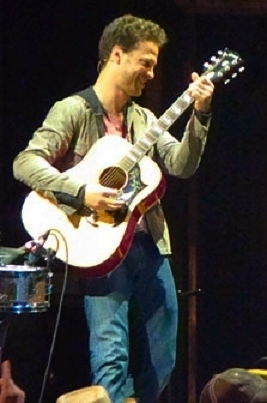
Guarini at the Hard Rock Cafe in Atlanta (2012)

In May 2008, Guarini released an acoustic EP titled Revolve comprising three songs ("Sweet Time", "Rock Bottom", and "When She Cries") co-written and co-produced with Shaun Ingram.

While stepping out to support the opening of The American Idol Experience at Disney's Hollywood Studios in February 2009, Guarini confirmed his impending marriage to his fiancée, Reina Capodici. In an exclusive pictorial of the wedding, People reported that the couple married on September 26, 2009.

=== 2010–present: Acting, hosting and performing ===
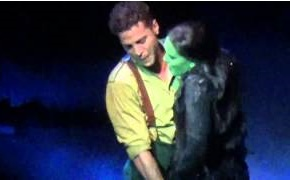
Wicked with Guarini as Fiyero

Guarini became a part of the Broadway community with his 2010 Broadway debut as Carlos in a musical adaptation of Pedro Almodovar's film Women on the Verge of a Nervous Breakdown. Critics called Guarini's debut "surprisingly charming", "captivating" and "extremely likeable".

Guarini played Will, one of the three male leads in Green Day's rock musical American Idiot performing March 1, 2011, through the show's closing night, April 24, 2011.

On April 26, 2011, his first child with wife Reina Capodici was born. His second child was born on February 25, 2013.

In 2013, Guarini was cast in a modern Broadway production of William Shakespeare's Romeo and Juliet as Paris. After its Broadway run, the live-filmed stage play was released in movie theaters. Guarini joined the Broadway production of Wicked, in the role of Fiyero from February 25 to December 14, 2014.

Other stage work includes lead roles in regional productions of Rent, Chicago, Company and Joseph and the Amazing Technicolor Dreamcoat. Original regional productions include Ghost Brothers of Darkland County as one of two feuding brothers in 2012 at the Alliance Theatre in Atlanta, Georgia. In It's A Wonderful Life, A Live Radio Play Guarini voiced George Bailey in a 2015 on-stage comedic production.

In 2015, he starred in the New York City Center Encores presentation Paint Your Wagon. Praised by critics, Guarini played the outcast Mexican miner. Guarini starred in the 2015 original musical "Moonshine: The Hee Haw Musical" premiering at the Dallas Theater Center on September 2 through October 11, and Mamma Mia! in 2016. Also in 2016, Guarini was cast in Broadway's new In Transit, the first a cappella musical with book, music and lyrics by Kristen Anderson-Lopez, James-Allen Ford, Russ Kaplan, and Sara Wordsworth.

Guarini participates in Equity staged readings of The Awakening of Angel DeLuna, hosts and/or performs for various Broadway and stage-related benefits, and other industry-related events including Broadway on the Hudson, the Times Square Tony Awards Simulcast in 2014 and 2015, adding executive producer duties in 2015. He was an executive producer for the 2015 revival of the musical Side Show.

In 2016, Guarini attended the Tony Awards, and co-hosted backstage coverage of the live broadcast in conjunction with BroadwayHD.com.

He's also acted in independent film projects such as the drama and action film Fast Girl, The Unknown: Frankie The Squirrel, Mafioso II: The Son and short film Tilt-a-Whirl for the Dances With Films festival.

Since 2015, Guarini has been starring as Lil' Sweet in Diet Dr Pepper television commercials, and web marketing. In 2016, Dr Pepper "promoted" tunes for a Lil' Sweet "album" with video clips, promotional pictures of the character, and the character's own Twitter page. In 2016 Guarini released his exclusive 17 track EP "JG" via PledgeMusic.

In 2021, Guarini starred as Prince Charming in the world premiere of the jukebox musical Once Upon a One More Time. He reprised the role when the musical transferred to Broadway's Marquis Theatre in May 2023.

== Personal life ==
From September 2009 to December 2025, Guarini was married to Reina Capodici. They had two sons together.

== Discography ==
=== Studio albums ===
Year	Album details	Peak	Certifications (sales threshold)
Year	Album details	US	Certifications (sales threshold)
2003	Justin Guarini: Released: June 10, 2003; Label: RCA Records	20	US sales:146,000
2005	Stranger Things Have Happened: Released: December 12, 2005; Label: Justice Entertainment, Ltd	—	US sales: N/A
"—" denotes releases that did not chart

==== Other contributions ====
- Foreign Shores by David Hughes (featured vocalist) 2009
- The Awakening of Angel DeLuna (cast album) 2009
- I Could Use a Drink by Drew Gasparini (featured vocalist) 2012
- Where the Sky Ends: Music by Michael Mott by Michael Mott (featured vocalist) 2014
- Women on the Verge of a Nervous Breakdown (Original Broadway Cast) 2011
- Paint Your Wagon (cast album) 2014
- In Transit (cast album) 2016

=== EPs ===
- Revolve (Acoustic) (May 2008)
- "JG" (2016)

=== Songs ===
- Did You Know That I Know Your Journey? (2006) (vocals, music, co-produced)
- Everlasting for documentary Project Everlasting (2006) (vocals, music, lyrics, piano)
- What You Won't Do for Love for Drivetime Reflections (2010) (vocals)

== Filmography and theater ==
=== Films ===
Year	Title	Role
2003	From Justin to Kelly	Justin Bell
2008	Fast Girl	Darryl K. Sands

=== Television ===
Year	Title	Role	Notes
2011	Wizards of Waverly Place	Keith Keith	Episode: "Wizard of the Year"
2018	Forgotten Son	Aden	
2019	Blaze and the Monster Machines	Genie (voice)	Episode: "Blaze and the Magic Genie"
2023	SuperKitties	Cat Burglar (voice)	Recurring role
2023	Below Deck Sailing Yacht	Himself	2 episodes

=== Theater roles ===
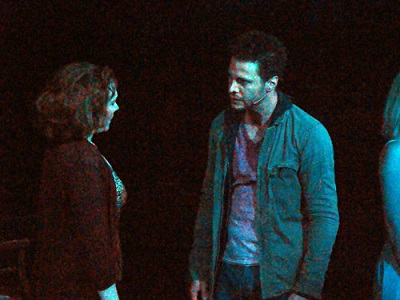
Guarini in Ghost Brothers of Darkland County

- Good Vibrations (2004) as Jan
- The Awakening of Angel DeLuna (2009) as Fred
- Women on the Verge of a Nervous Breakdown (2010–2011 Broadway) as Carlos
- American Idiot (2011 Broadway) as Will
- Rent (2011 Regional) as Roger Davis
- Chicago (2011 Regional) as Billy Flynn
- Ghost Brothers of Darkland County (2012 Regional) as Drake McCandless
- Joseph and the Amazing Technicolor Dreamcoat (2012 Regional) as Joseph
- It's a Wonderful Life: A Live Radio Play (2012 Regional) as Jake
- Romeo and Juliet (2013 Broadway) as Paris
- Wicked (2014 Broadway) as Fiyero
- Paint Your Wagon (2015 New York City Center) as Julio
- Company (2015 Regional) as Bobby
- Moonshine: That Hee Haw Musical (2015 Regional)
- First Gentleman (2016 NYC)
- Mamma Mia! (2016 Regional) as Sam Carmichael
- Cake Off (2016 Regional) multiple roles
- In Transit (2016 Broadway) as Trent
- Once Upon a One More Time (2021 Regional, 2023 Broadway) as Prince Charming
