= The Nigerian Job =

- Leverage episode
- Episode no.: Season 1 Episode 1
- Directed by: Dean Devlin
- Written by: John Rogers & Chris Downey
- Original air date: December 7, 2008

Guest appearances
- Saul Rubinek as Victor Dubenich; Tony Bill as Pierson

Episode chronology
← Previous —	Next → "The Homecoming Job"

"The Nigerian Job" is the pilot episode of the American cable television comedy-drama Leverage. It originally aired on December 7, 2008, on TNT.

In this episode, Nate and his team must steal back stolen airplane designs from an aerospace engineer's rival. However, when their employer tries to have them killed, they learn that they were not stealing them back, but just stealing them from the original designer, Nate and his team decide to take revenge and steal them back again.

== Plot ==
=== The (First) Setup ===
Nate Ford, a former insurance investigator, is drinking in a bar when Victor Dubenich approaches him. He asks Nate (Timothy Hutton) to join with a group of thieves to steal back his airplane plans from his rival whom he says stole them from him. He has a shareholder meeting coming up, and the legal avenues will not solve his problem in time. Nate is reluctant, but Dubenich informs him that his rival, Pierson Aviation, is insured by IYS, Nate's former insurance company, who refused to pay for the treatment that would have saved the life of Nate's son.

Nate looks at the team that Dubenich has assembled. It consists of Alec Hardison (Aldis Hodge), a computer hacker, Eliot Spencer (Christian Kane), a retrieval expert, and Parker (Beth Riesgraf), a thief. All three are criminals that Nate chased at one point while investigating insurance claims. Nate tells Dubenich that each of these people work alone, but Dubenich tells him he is paying them $300,000 apiece, and that Nate's fee will be double that for being the “honest man” who oversees the job.

=== The (First) Job ===
Nate watches over the job from a secure location while Parker, Hardison and Eliot work the job itself. Hardison oversees the security while Parker performs the stealth moves required and Eliot acts as “the hitter,” the one who provides backup for the team with martial arts fighting.

From the roof of Pierson Aviation, Parker drops in and enters the building through a hole cut in the glass window. She overrides the elevator and sends Hardison and Eliot (who are on top of the elevator shaft) to the server room.

Inside Pierson Aviation, Hardison attempts to hack his way into the server room where they will find the stolen plans on the computer. However, security does their walkthrough early so they can watch the NBA Playoffs, and Hardison is found by four security agents. He motions that he is surrendering, and Eliot appears and takes out the four guards.

They steal the plans and take the elevator down, where they must improvise a plan to get past the desk security. They are picked up by Nate outside the office and they drive to another location where Hardison sends the plans to Dubenich. They agree to walk away and admit that it was fun to work on the same side for once, but Eliot says that it was “one show, no encores” and Parker says she has already forgotten their names. The four of them walk separate ways.

The next morning, Nate receives a call from Dubenich who frantically claims he never received the plans. Nate tells him he told him not to trust the others, but Dubenich says he has frozen payments. He and Nate agree to meet at one of Dubenich's old facilities.

Nate arrives at the abandoned facility to find Hardison, holding a gun on Eliot where each are accusing the other of a double cross. Nate manages to disarm Hardison and Parker arrives with her own gun, also complaining that she was not paid. Nate laughs, realizing that the only way they would ever get together again would be realizing they weren't getting paid. They panic, realizing trouble awaits them. They narrowly escape the facility before the building blows up.

=== The (Second) Setup ===
The four all awake in a hospital, handcuffed to their beds and chairs. Their prints have been sent to the FBI and they know that they have little time before they all wind up in jail. Nate tells them that they have to work together to escape. While none of the other three trust the others, they trust Nate because he is “an honest man.”

With Parker's pick-pocketing skills, Hardison's electronic skills and Nate's planning skills, they acquire a cell phone and manage to con the police into believing Hardison is an undercover FBI Agent and he takes the rest of them out of the building under this façade.

Back at Hardison's, Hardison looks at the copies of the plans that he kept, and evidence deep within the code proves that the plans belonged to Pierson and not Dubenich. The four decide they want revenge for their own reasons. Hardison and Eliot want payback, while Parker's main motivation is “a lot of money.” Nate's motivation is that Dubenich used his son.

They go to find Sophie Deveraux, a grifter who is also an actress. Nate also chased her during his insurance investigations and she is talented at conning people. Since Dubenich knows their faces and thinks they are dead, Sophie will play an integral role in conning Dubenich and the team getting their payback.

=== The (Second) Job ===
Dubenich arrives at his office and his secretary tells him his appointment has arrived. He is confused, but is intrigued by Sophie's good looks and Sophie introduces herself by an alias, a mediator from Nigeria, where she claims they are looking for a revitalization of their economy by building an aircraft manufacturing facility. Sophie draws him out of the office to let Hardison, Parker and Eliot do their work.

The five team members are communicating on earpieces (com devices). Remotely, Hardison crashes Dubenich's secretary's computer. She calls IT, which Hardison routes to be answered by Parker, who tells her that someone is already on her floor. Eliot enters, posing as an IT tech and romantically distracts the secretary while Parker drops in from an air duct and plants a transmitter before leaving through the same air duct.

Outside the office, while Dubenich initially turns down Sophie's tempting offer, she forces him to reconsider by telling him she will take the offer to his more experienced rival, Pierson. Dubenich accepts the offer and they agree to set up a meeting between Dubenich and the Nigerians.

They meet at an office building, where Eliot has put up signs on one of the floors for Sophie's corporation's office. Dubenich goes to search for the company in the electronic directory, and Nate sets off car alarms to distract him. He begins searching in the directory, but Sophie arrives in the lobby and takes him to the tenth floor. In the elevator, she tells Dubenich that there will be a “finder’s fee” which Dubenich agrees is expected.

They sit down in the office with the Nigerians where vague plans regarding the deal are discussed. When terms are agreed on, Sophie mentions “the other matter.” The leader of the group hands Sophie an envelope which she hands to Dubenich. He opens it where a sheet of paper quotes a finder's fee of one million dollars. He agrees to the amount.

Back at his office, Dubenich tells his associate that they are being conned. He discovers the transmitter in his office and figures out that Nate, Hardison, Parker and Eliot are still alive. He decides that he will call the FBI to the next meeting where he will expose the con during his shareholder meeting.

During the shareholder meeting, Dubenich invites Sophie to his office where he tells her the Nigerians are waiting. He wants to finish the deal. When they get up to his office, Dubenich calls in the FBI who begin to arrest him. He is confused when they tell him that he is under arrest for soliciting a bribe from Nigerian officials.

Dubenich rushes downstairs to inform his shareholders that it is a mistake. He is followed down by the FBI and the Nigerians. The Nigerians tell him that they have no office in LA, but that they met at Dubenich's other office where they gave him a check for $200,000. Because Dubenich contracts with the government, he could be in a lot of trouble due to regulations concerning contact with foreign nationals and that things would be a lot better for him if he still had an undeposited check. Dubenich can't produce it and he is arrested.

=== The Flashbacks ===
- The first flashback of the episode shows Hardison, "the Hacker", getting busted in a hotel room for credit card fraud posing as Mick Jagger. This flashback shows that he has been doing this type of work for at least 5 years.
- The next flashback shows Elliot on a job three years ago, also showing why he is specifically nicknamed "the Hitter".
- Next they have a flashback for Parker, "the Thief", being scolded as a child for "stealing" her stuffed rabbit, which had been confiscated as a punishment. She walks out of the house shortly before it blows up, at which point she hugs the rabbit and skips away.
- In a flashback to the first meeting with the Nigerians, Eliot is shown switching signs between the arrival of Dubenich and the Nigerians, from a sign for Sophie's fake company to a sign for Dubenich's company.
- In another flashback to the first meeting, the Nigerian is shown putting the check into the envelope and handing it to Sophie, who, while view is blocked by another person, switches it to the envelope which she handed to Dubenich.
- Another flashback to seven years shows Nate surprising Sophie in the act of stealing a portrait in an unnamed Paris facility. She gets off one gunshot that nails him in the shoulder. As soon as she turns around, he puts a bullet of his own in an unidentified area. This startles her and she looks back at Nate and calls him a "wanker".

=== The Wrap-Up ===
The FBI, including Nate's team in disguise, carry boxes from Dubenich's office. News reports show that Dubenich's stock has plummeted. As he sits watching the FBI search his office, his phone rings. Nate tells him that he should have just paid them. Dubenich is confused, claiming he found the transmitter and Nate tells him they wanted him to discover part of the con so that he would sink himself and his stock would plummet, while Nate and his team made millions of dollars by short selling the stock. He tells him that if Dubenich tells the FBI about them, they won't be so nice the next time.

The group splits up once again, agreeing once again to go their separate ways, with Eliot and Parker repeating the lines they used the first time they walked away. One-by-one, however, the other four rejoin Nate, agreeing that they had fun and that they should continue.

Nate returns the plans to Pierson along with proof that they’d been on Dubenich's computers. He turns them over in exchange for investigation of the original theft being dropped. As Nate walks away, Pierson asks why he doesn't want money. Nate replies that the job had an “alternate revenue stream.”

The team meets with a new client who sadly tells them of their loss. They wonder why Nate's team is doing what they do. Nate replies:

’’People like that…corporations like that, they have all the money and all the power and they use it to make people like you go away. Right now, you are suffering under an enormous weight. We provide…Leverage.’’

== Critical reception ==
The episode aired on TNT on December 7, 2008, and was watched by 4.99 million viewers.

Writing for AOL TV, Jason Hughes called the pilot, “one of the better premieres I've seen in the last several years.” He writes, “There's potential for this premise to go years without getting stale. Hell, it could even handle cast changes and keep going. The strength of tonight's episode was in watching how they pulled off the original heist and then how they took down the fat cat who left them to die.”
