= Kane (American band) =

American rock band

- Origin: Los Angeles, California
- Genres: Southern rock Country rock Americana
- Years active: 1998–2010
- Label: None (independent)
- Members: Christian Kane; Steve Carlson
- Past members: Michael Eaton; Will Amend; Craig Eastman; Jason Southard; Ted Russell Kamp; Ryan Baker; Timothy Jimenez; Melissa Reiner
- Website: KaneMusic.com

Kane was an American country rock, southern rock, and Americana band formed in 1998 in Los Angeles, California, fronted by actor Christian Kane, and officially dissolved in 2010. The band self-released two successful independent albums and toured both the U.S., Europe, and beyond.

== History ==
Formed in 1998 in Los Angeles, California, the band Kane was founded by musicians Christian Kane, Steve Carlson, and Michael Eaton.

=== Live Performances and Touring ===
The band received positive reviews for their energetic live performances at notable Hollywood-area venues The Viper Room, King King, Ivar Theatre, and Universal CityWalk, and at the prominent celebrity-studded benefit concert event Warner Bros. Sizzlin’ Country fundraiser for Cystic Fibrosis Foundation, historically held on the Warner Bros. Studios backlot in Burbank, CA, as well as other performances around Southern California. In addition to the U.S., the band also performed in South America, Australia, and throughout Europe, steadily expanding their fanbase.

=== Album Releases and Song Features ===
Throughout 2000 and 2001, the Kane band recorded tracks to compile for an album release. An 8-track self-titled debut album was self-released in 2001. A 10-track Enhanced CD version was self-released in 2002; this version adds two audio tracks and a multimedia data partition—when inserted into a PC or Mac CD-ROM drive, the disc loads interactive bonus features. The primary upgrade of the "Enhanced" 10-track CD is the inclusion of live music video footage captured during a 2002 performance at Universal CityWalk. This bonus footage features live energetic performances, including a live cover of Prince's classic "I Could Never Take the Place of Your Man". Despite somewhat limited touring, the band Kane’s self-released debut album independently sold over 4,500 units, with nearly half those CD copies selling in countries as far away from California as Malaysia, Germany, Australia, the U.K., and Brazil.

The band's music has been featured in television and film:

- Christian stars on the 2001 episode of Angel, Season 2, Episode 18: "Dead End" and sings live as character Lindsey McDonald a rendition of "L.A. Song".
- The band's song "Sweet Carolina Rain" is featured in the April 2002 film Life or Something Like It.
- The band's song "The Chase" is featured in the January 2003 film Just Married. appears in
- The band's song "More Than I Deserve" is featured in the January 2003 CBS television movie The Crooked E: The Unshredded Truth About Enron and the 2008 episode of TNT television series Leverage, Season 1, Episode 3: "The Two-Horse Job".
- The band's song "Thinking of You" is featured in the 2010 episode of TNT television series Leverage, Season 3, Episode 6: "The Studio Job".

=== Accolades ===
During the course of their career, Kane worked alongside different studio/sessionmusicians. By touring internationally, the band managed to build up a worldwide fan following, who are typically known as "Kaniacs."

In late-2004, during a touring hiatus, the Kane band was voted winner of the 2005 Country Thunder Young Guns Contest. This recognition helped secure a vote as one of L.A.'s 100 Hottest Unsigned Bands by music industry trade magazine Music Connection, and both Rock City News and E Media Wire Service described the band as "Killer."

=== Hiatus and Reunion ===
On October 12, 2004, the band played what was heavily promoted as their "final Los Angeles show"; the venue was House of Blues on Sunset Strip in Los Angeles, CA. Because Christian was shifting his focus heavily toward Nashville songwriting and his acting career, many casual listeners and early internet forums mistakenly reported this as the permanent disbandment of the band. In actuality, the band traveled overseas to perform international tour dates. On October 30, 2004, they recorded intimate acoustic performances for what would later become the October 2005 self-released album Acoustic Live In London! The band then went on a brief touring hiatus in late-2004.

During this exact window, Fall 2004, voting for the 2005 Country Thunder Young Guns contest took place online. In large part because their fanbase, the Kaniacs, mobilized in grave support, the Kane band won the contest, and the band formally reunited for a celebratory performance at the Country Thunder festival on April 15, 2005, at Canyon Moon Ranch in Florence, Arizona.

Instead of disbanding after, the band actually continued to perform and play shows sporadically for several more years. The Kane band did not officially dissolve until 2010 when Christian Kane signed a major-label recording contract.

The final official performance of the Kane band as an active collective unit took place on January 23, 2010. The members reunited for one last full-band headlining show at 12th & Porter, a legendary live music venue in Nashville, Tennessee, delivering a massive high-energy set of their classic songs to a packed house of devoted Kaniacs, signaling the end of an era. The performance served as a definitive transition point for Christian Kane's music career. Shortly after this final Kane band concert, Christian Kane officially signed a major-label solo recording contract with Bigger Picture Music Group/EMI Records Nashville. With that, the Kane band name was officially retired so the industry could back Christian exclusively as a solo artist. When he went into the studio later that 2010 year to cut his major-label debut album, he did so under his own name.

=== Collaborations Beyond the Band ===
The Kane band did not reform nor perform as a full collective unit after the January 23, 2010, performance; that was the official final performance as the active Kane band, but its core members continued to collaborate heavily. The musical partnership between co-founders Christian Kane and Steve Carlson remained highly active; the duo continued to write and compose music together long after the band split. When Christian launched his solo career and released his 2010 major-label debut, Steve was intimately involved in writing and supporting the project. The duo has since frequently reunited for one-off acoustic performances, special events, and intimate sets for fans. They perform Kane band classics alongside Christian's solo country music tracks and the two's respective solo material, essentially keeping alive the spirit of the original Kane band.

=== Going Solo ===
In 2004, Christian signed a lucrative songwriting & publishing deal with EMI Music Publishing Nashville, which was the publishing arm of the EMI Group operating at the time. In late-2007, he signed with Columbia Records Nashville, his first major-label recording contract. This began the dissolution of the Kane band when the band name and idea were abandoned, with the label instead marketing Christian Kane as a solo artist. He self-released his first EP in March 2010 on his own label, Outlaw Saints Music, with major-label distribution support from Bigger Picture Music Group.

Later still, in June 2010, Christian signed with Bigger Picture/EMI Records Nashville as a recording artist, becoming only the second artist to join the then newly formed label. He released his major-label debut album in December 2010 on Bigger Picture Music Group.

== Band members ==
- Christian Kane - lead vocals
- Steve Carlson - rhythm guitar, backing vocals
- Craig Eastman - fiddle, lap steel, mandolin
- Jason Southard - lead guitar
- Michael Eaton - lead guitar, composer
- Will Amend - bass guitar
- Ted Russell Kamp - bass guitar
- Ryan Baker - drums
- Timothy Jimenez - drums
- Melissa Reiner - violin

== Discography ==
=== Self-Released ===
Album information	Track listing
Kane: Released: 2001 (U.S.); Label: Self-Released; Re-released: 2002 (U.S.); Enhanced CD, feat. bonus live multimedia footage recorded at Universal Citywalk, Los Angeles, CA; Label: Self-Released	2001 Version: 1. Sweet Carolina Rain; 2. Rattlesnake Smile; 3. Crazy In Love; 4. Don't Come Home; 5. The Chase; 6. Spirit Boy; 7. One More Shot; 8. America High; 2002 Version: 9. In The Darkness; 10. Oklahoma State of Mind
Acoustic Live In London!: Released: October 2005 (U.S.); Label: Self-Released	1. Intro; 2. Spirit Boy; 3. Spirit Boy Outro; 4. More Than I Deserve; 5. Intro To In The Darkness; 6. In The Darkness; 7. In The Darkness Outro; 8. Middle American Saturday Night; 9. Intro To The Chase; 10. The Chase; 11. Intro To Mary Can You Come Outside; 12. Mary Can You Come Outside; 13. Intro To America High; 14. America High; 15. Intro To One More Shot; 16. One More Shot; 17. Intro To Pinata Novia; 18. Pinata Novia; 19. Intro To Mama; 20. Mama; 21. Intro To Track 29; 22. Track 29; 23. Thank You And Intro To Seven Days; 24. Seven Days

== Filmography ==
Title	Song(s) Featured
Angel, Season 2, Episode 18: "Dead End" (TV) (2001)	"L.A. Song"
Life or Something Like It (2002)	"Sweet Carolina Rain"
Just Married (2003)	"The Chase"
Crooked E: The Unshredded Truth About Enron (TV) (2003)	"More Than I Deserve"
Leverage, Season 1, Episode 3: "The Two-Horse Job" (TV) (2008)	"More Than I Deserve"
Leverage, Season 3, Episode 6: "The Studio Job" (TV) (2010)	"Thinking of You"
