= Craig Eastman =

Craig Eastman may refer to:

- Craig Eastman (musician) in Kane (American band)
- Craig Eastman (The Only Way Is Essex)
