= Duberman =

Duberman may refer to one of the following individuals:

- Justin Duberman (born 1970), retired American ice hockey right winger
- Larry Duberman, a fictional character from the third season Leverage episode "The Reunion Job"
- Martin Duberman (born 1930), American historian, philosopher, playwright, and gay-rights activist
