= List of Leverage episodes =

List of episodes from the TV series Leverage (2008–2012)

Leverage is a U.S. television drama series, which ran on TNT from December 7, 2008 to December 25, 2012. The series was produced by director/executive producer Dean Devlin's production company Electric Television. Leverage followed a five-person team made up of Alec Hardison, Eliot Spencer, Sophie Devereaux, Parker, and former insurance investigator Nate Ford, who used their skills to right corporate and governmental injustices inflicted on common citizens.

Leverage was canceled on December 21, 2012 amid falling ratings. The final episode, which was produced as a possible series finale, aired December 25, 2012.

A total of 77 episodes of Leverage were broadcast over five seasons.

A sequel, Leverage: Redemption, premiered in July 2021.

== Series overview ==
Season	Episodes	Originally released	
Season	Episodes	First released	Last released
1	13	December 7, 2008	February 24, 2009
2	15	July 15, 2009	February 17, 2010
3	16	June 20, 2010	December 19, 2010
4	18	June 26, 2011	January 15, 2012
5	15	July 15, 2012	December 25, 2012

== Episodes ==
=== Season 1 (2008–09) ===
No. overall	No. in season	Title	Directed by	Written by	Original release date	U.S. viewers (millions)
1	1	"The Nigerian Job"	Dean Devlin	John Rogers & Chris Downey	December 7, 2008	4.99
Approached by Victor Dubenich, former insurance investigator Nathan Ford is recruited to watch over a team of thieves as they steal Dubenich's research back from the company that took it, in the process slamming the insurance company that let Ford's son die. However, all is not as it seems and the team is betrayed. In response, they go for revenge and a substantial payback. Note: This episode was initially broadcast as a 55-minute commercial-free presentation. Subsequent broadcasts were shown with commercials.
2	2	"The Homecoming Job"	Dean Devlin	John Rogers	December 9, 2008	3.11
Under the name "Leverage Consulting & Associates," the team reunites for "one more job" in order to get justice for wounded veteran Cpl. Perry, shot by a government contractor in Iraq. The game changes, however, when the team realizes that Perry was not shot by accident, but to keep him from talking about something and the team realizes that a congressman may be involved.
3	3	"The Two-Horse Job"	Craig R. Baxley	Melissa Glenn & Jessica Rieder	December 16, 2008	2.98
A high-rolling Wall Street broker burns down his own stable to kill off his underperforming racehorses. The Leverage team goes to Kentucky to help the heartbroken horse trainer who has lost everything. The horse trainer's daughter is initially hostile towards Eliot as the two were together in the past. The team's scheme almost gets derailed by the appearance of Jim Sterling, Nate's former co-worker and long-time nemesis, who attempts to ruin the entire plan.
4	4	"The Miracle Job"	Arvin Brown	Christine Boylan	December 23, 2008	2.66
A Catholic priest, who is an old friend of Nate's, is attacked before he can lobby the city of Los Angeles to save his church. The Leverage team stages a miracle to help, but it ends up attracting too much attention to their mission.
5	5	"The Bank Shot Job"	Dean Devlin	Amy Berg	December 30, 2008	3.77
The team's attempt to take down a corrupt county court judge hits a snag when a father and his son take the local bank hostage, leaving everyone including Nate and Sophie trapped inside. The situation escalates when the corrupt county judge starts calling the shots and vowing not to let any of the hostages go until he's gotten his money. Parker and Hardison, who are posing as FBI agents, handle the hostage crisis as well as the local authorities but the crisis gets even grimmer when the team learns that a woman with very close ties to the father and son duo has been kidnapped and is being held prisoner, forcing the team into a race where they not only have to save the woman's life but stop the corrupt county judge as well.
6	6	"The Stork Job"	Marc Roskin	Albert Kim	January 6, 2009	2.85
The Leverage team goes after a Serbian adoption agency that's scamming money from desperate American couples looking to adopt needy war orphans. The job hits close to home for Parker who also was an orphan, and Hardison, a former foster child.
7	7	"The Wedding Job"	Jonathan Frakes	Chris Downey	January 13, 2009	2.66
To retrieve the money promised to the family of an innocent man who took the fall for a Mafia boss and went to prison, the Leverage team poses as wedding planners for the don's only daughter. On her big day, Eliot, acting as chef, has a run-in with an old enemy: The Butcher of Kiev.
8	8	"The Mile High Job"	Rob Minkoff	Amy Berg	January 20, 2009	2.83
A couple comes to Leverage headquarters and tells the team about their daughter who was killed by a company's toxic fertilizer. When the team (minus Hardison) boards a plane to recover the "assets" which could prove that the company was culpable for the girl's death, they discover that the "assets" are company employees (Sara Rue) and the plane has been sabotaged to crash. It now falls to Hardison to save the day.
9	9	"The Snow Job"	Tony Bill	Albert Kim	January 27, 2009	2.81
Nate has an emotional connection to the case of a National Guardsman whose home was foreclosed by a crooked contractor. He jeopardizes the team by hitting the bottle again, then jeopardizes the job by deciding to go for a bigger scam with an even bigger payout.
10	10	"The 12-Step Job"	Rod Hardy	Amy Berg & Chris Downey	February 3, 2009	2.79
The team goes after an unscrupulous financial director who stole from charity. After forcing him into rehab for his many addictions, the mission changes when Nate learns their mark is in fact robbing the rich (and criminal) and giving to the poor.
11	11	"The Juror #6 Job"	Jonathan Frakes	Rebecca Kirsch	February 10, 2009	3.21
One of Parker's aliases gets called in for jury duty, and Nate forces her to go in order to learn to work better with others. While there Parker finds that various people involved in the case are being paid off, including the plaintiff's lawyer. The team then sets out to "steal" the verdict and stop a ruthless drug heiress from destroying a young grieving widow who is suing the company over the death of her husband three years previously.
12	12	"The First David Job"	Dean Devlin	John Rogers	February 17, 2009	2.91
The team decides to target Ian Blackpoole, the CEO of the insurance company that let Nate's son die, by stealing and then selling him his own maquette of Michelangelo's David. However, complications arise when Nate's ex-wife shows up and even more so when Sterling returns.
13	13	"The Second David Job"	Dean Devlin	Chris Downey & John Rogers	February 24, 2009	3.32
To take down his former boss Ian Blackpoole, Nate must get his fractured team to work together again. However, with Blackpoole and Sterling knowing their faces, the team is going to need someone on the inside to help them pull off the job: Nate's ex-wife Maggie.

=== Season 2 (2009–10) ===
No. overall	No. in season	Title	Directed by	Written by	Original release date	U.S. viewers (millions)
14	1	"The Beantown Bailout Job"	Dean Devlin	John Rogers	July 15, 2009	3.89
Six months after exacting revenge on his former company, a newly sober Nate's attempt to resume a normal life is derailed when he helps a car crash victim who was about to expose a major bank fraud. The team has returned to their old ways, but are not anywhere near as satisfied as they were before, and they all reunite to take down the banker and the Irish mob.
15	2	"The Tap-Out Job"	Marc Roskin	Albert Kim	July 22, 2009	3.05
The Leverage team travels to Nebraska to scam a crooked mixed martial arts promoter into signing away his money and his fight league but when their mark gets wise, Eliot has to step into the ring.
16	3	"The Order 23 Job"	Rod Hardy	Chris Downey	July 29, 2009	3.68
To get a convicted felon to reveal the location of his stolen money, the Leverage team steals the hospital he's confined to and stages a disease outbreak. Meanwhile, Eliot gets distracted when posing as a guard, he sees a young boy being treated and comes to suspect that the boy's father is responsible for the mysterious injuries which means that the youngster is being abused.
17	4	"The Fairy Godparents Job"	Jonathan Frakes	Amy Berg	August 5, 2009	3.69
The team attempts to rip off an unscrupulous investment banker by stealing his lovable loser stepson's school, and Sophie & Eliot pose as the boy's "fairy godparents"; Parker and Hardison run into two old FBI friends in the process.
18	5	"The Three Days of the Hunter Job"	Marc Roskin	Melissa Glenn & Jessica Rieder	August 12, 2009	3.16
Sophie and Nate switch places as the team cons a tabloid newscaster with a fake story about a government cover-up, but when their target starts believing the story, major problems arise.
19	6	"The Top Hat Job"	Peter O'Fallon	M. Scott Veach & Christine Boylan	August 19, 2009	3.43
The team infiltrates a company selling tainted food by posing as magicians.
20	7	"The Two Live Crew Job"	Dean Devlin	Amy Berg & John Rogers	August 26, 2009	3.73
It's thief vs. thief as the Leverage team goes up against another crew—run by an old "friend" (Griffin Dunne) of Sophie's—to retrieve a stolen painting. Sophie's continuing identity crisis leads her to make a big decision.
21	8	"The Ice Man Job"	Jeremiah Chechik	Christine Boylan	September 2, 2009	3.58
Hardison goes undercover as the team—minus Sophie (sort of)—takes on a diamond merchant.
22	9	"The Lost Heir Job"	Peter Winther	Chris Downey	September 9, 2009	3.37
The Leverage team targets a shady lawyer looking to usurp his deceased client's estate. In an attempt to retrieve the money from the estate which was promised to a charity, Parker plays the client's long-lost daughter and claims to be his heir. With Sophie still in London, the team works with an uptight lawyer as a chaperone, but they soon find out that there's more to her than meets the eye.
23	10	"The Runway Job"	Mark Roskin	Albert Kim	January 13, 2010	3.69
The team enters the fashion industry to con a sweatshop owning couple while they cope with their newest member. Things get very complicated when they learn that their marks are in bed with the Triads.
24	11	"The Bottle Job"	Jonathan Frakes	Christine Boylan	January 20, 2010	3.00
When a loan shark tries to take over McRory's Pub, the Leverage team resorts to the classic "wire" con, with a little over an hour to pull it off. However, Nate is put on the spot to confront his problem with the bottle.
25	12	"The Zanzibar Marketplace Job"	Jeremiah Chechik	Melissa Glenn & Jessica Rieder	January 27, 2010	3.02
Nate's ex-wife Maggie is framed for a jewel theft in Kiev, and the team must work with an old adversary to save her.
26	13	"The Future Job"	Mark Roskin	Amy Berg & Chris Downey	February 3, 2010	2.91
The team goes after a ruthless grifter posing as a psychic, but come across a problem when an ex-con kidnaps him to divine the location of some stolen goods.
27	14	"The Three Strikes Job"	Dean Devlin	John Rogers	February 10, 2010	2.8
Lt. Patrick Bonanno of the Massachusetts State Police is shot while trying to take down a corrupt mayor (Richard Kind), and the team steps in to finish what he started. But when their mark's true motives are finally revealed, finishing the con gets just a little harder.
28	15	"The Maltese Falcon Job"	Dean Devlin	John Rogers	February 17, 2010	2.8
With Sterling, the FBI, and anyone else carrying a badge in pursuit, the Leverage team hides in plain sight to complete a daring con of the mayor and his gunrunning partner.

=== Season 3 (2010) ===
No. overall	No. in season	Title	Directed by	Written by	Original release date	U.S. viewers (millions)
29	1	"The Jailhouse Job"	Dean Devlin	John Rogers	June 20, 2010	3.11
While Nate is in a supermax prison, he must work with the team to escape in order to unmask the prison's corrupt warden and to save an inmate. Working behind the scenes is a mysterious Italian woman known only as "The Italian" who blackmails the crew into taking down Damien Moreau, a rich, powerful and untouchable crime lord. If the team does not take out Moreau in six months, Nate will be imprisoned in Italy, and the team will be killed.
30	2	"The Reunion Job"	Jonathan Frakes	Michael Colton & John Aboud	June 20, 2010	2.95
The team goes undercover during a high school reunion they hijacked to get a critical password from a powerful software executive named Larry Duberman.
31	3	"The Inside Job"	John Rogers	Geoffrey Thorne	June 27, 2010	3.45
While working a theft on behalf of her father figure and mentor Archie Leach (Richard Chamberlain), Parker becomes trapped somewhere in a forty-story building with a state-of-the-art security system, and the team must scam their way in to save her before she gets caught and arrested by the security staff.
32	4	"The Scheherazade Job"	Peter Winther	Chris Downey	June 27, 2010	3.24
Hardison takes up the violin and joins the symphony as part of the team's plan to rob the vault of a corrupt African government official. He learns the hard way what it takes to be a leader after expressing his interest in running his own crew one day to Nate.
33	5	"The Double-Blind Job"	Marc Roskin	Melissa Glenn & Jessica Rieder	July 11, 2010	2.89
Running a double blind-like scam, the team enters the pharmaceutical business to take down a corrupt CEO and stop his plan to release a fatal prescription pain reliever. Meanwhile, Parker gets jealous when Hardison spends more time with the client and finds it hard to express how she feels for him.
34	6	"The Studio Job"	Jonathan Frakes	M. Scott Veach	July 18, 2010	3.91
To con a crooked record label executive, the Leverage crew infiltrates the country music industry—and inadvertently turns Eliot into a genuine star.
35	7	"The Gone-Fishin' Job"	John Harrison	Rebecca Kirsch	July 25, 2010	3.91
The team works to take down a con-man (Clancy Brown) using his collection agency posing as the IRS to fund a private revolution. But when his militia takes Eliot and Hardison captive, without the others knowing about it, Sophie, Parker and Nate are left on their own to complete the con.
36	8	"The Boost Job"	Marc Roskin	Albert Kim	August 1, 2010	3.49
The team goes up against a used car salesman whose dealership is stocked with stolen vehicles from a local chop shop.
37	9	"The Three-Card Monte Job"	Dean Devlin	Christine Boylan	August 8, 2010	3.21
Nate leads the team into battle against his father, the great Jimmy Ford (Tom Skerritt), who is running a scheme involving bank robberies and the Russian and Irish mobs.
38	10	"The Underground Job"	Marc Roskin	Melissa Glenn & Jessica Rieder	August 15, 2010	3.12
The team takes on a corrupt coal mine owner working with a dirty politician who also happens to be the local attorney general.
39	11	"The Rashomon Job"	Arvin Brown	John Rogers	August 22, 2010	3.37
While discussing the solo crimes they committed as independent thieves, the team members each reminisce about a particular night five years earlier, when it turns out they each unwittingly tried to steal the same artifact at the same time.
40	12	"The King George Job"	Millicent Shelton	Christine Boylan	August 29, 2010	2.89
The team heads to London after they discover that an antiquities trafficker who works for Damien Moreau is using refugee children to smuggle artifacts; Sophie confronts the consequences of her past.
41	13	"The Morning After Job"	Jonathan Frakes	Chris Downey	September 5, 2010	3.74
Leverage must get a former star hockey player turned crooked investor to give up his knowledge of Damien Moreau's financial dealings before he fulfills an immunity agreement by testifying before a grand jury the next day.
42	14	"The Ho Ho Ho Job"	Marc Roskin	Michael Colton & John Aboud	December 12, 2010	2.10
The team is hired by a former mall Santa to investigate the mall's owner. In the process, they discover that he is working with an old adversary to rob the Federal Depository.
43	15	"The Big Bang Job"	Marc Roskin	Chris Downey & Geoffrey Thorne	December 19, 2010	4.00
When The Italian tells the team that Damien Moreau is on his way to Washington, they must form a plan to prevent Moreau from selling a bomb at an auction, only for the plan to hit a snag when Eliot reveals to the team that he once worked for Moreau.
44	16	"The San Lorenzo Job"	Marc Roskin	John Rogers & M. Scott Veach	December 19, 2010	4.20
After Moreau escapes to San Lorenzo, the Leverage team follows him and must pose as election consultants for an honest and hard working politician in order to overthrow the current president of the country, who bought the presidency with the help of Moreau, triggering a final showdown between Moreau and the team as Nate vows to make sure that Moreau is taken down once and for all.

=== Season 4 (2011–12) ===
No. overall	No. in season	Title	Directed by	Written by	Original release date	U.S. viewers (millions)
45	1	"The Long Way Down Job"	Dean Devlin	Joe Hortua & John Rogers	June 26, 2011	3.42
The fate of a missing climber on an Alaskan mountain is the key to taking down a corrupt financier. When the team returns to Boston, they make a shocking discovery: their office is bugged, and someone is watching them.
46	2	"The 10 Li'l Grifters Job"	Arvin Brown	Geoffrey Thorne	July 3, 2011	2.46
A mark is killed during a masquerade ball in an isolated mansion, which leads to Nate becoming the prime suspect in a classic whodunit mystery, forcing the team to find out who killed their mark while also ensuring that Nate doesn't go down for a crime he didn't even commit. Note: Timothy Hutton (Nate) is dressed as Ellery Queen in honor of his father, Jim Hutton, who starred in the series of the same name.
47	3	"The 15 Minutes Job"	Marc Roskin	Josh Schaer	July 10, 2011	3.24
Nate plans to turn a shadowy political consultant into a celebrity—but can Nate himself resist the lure of the limelight?
48	4	"The Van Gogh Job"	John Rogers	Chris Downey	July 17, 2011	4.06
The team pursues a lost Van Gogh masterpiece, and reenacts a star-crossed love affair between the only two people who know its whereabouts.
49	5	"The Hot Potato Job"	John Harrison	Jenn Kao	July 24, 2011	3.25
Sophie leads a quickly improvised con to retrieve a stolen genetically engineered potato from a highly secure agribusiness headquarters.
50	6	"The Carnival Job"	Frank Oz	M. Scott Veach & Paul Guyot	July 31, 2011	3.38
The team attempts to steal a revolutionary new computer chip from a family household, but in the middle of their efforts, the child of the target's family is kidnapped during a chaotic carnival. Eliot must face an old adversary named Roper to get the child back.
51	7	"The Grave Danger Job"	John Harrison	Rebecca Kirsch	August 14, 2011	3.36
The Leverage crew target a grifter and her two sons who are running a funeral home when in actuality, they're embezzling money from her living clients and selling the identities of their dead loved ones to a drug cartel. As Parker's feelings for Hardison become clearer, things take a turn for the worse when the team learns that Hardison has been kidnapped and buried alive by the drug cartel who are using him as collateral, forcing the team into a race against time as they struggle to track his location and find him before he runs out of air while also finishing the original con of bringing down the grifter and her two sons.
52	8	"The Boiler Room Job"	Arvin Brown	Paul Guyot	August 14, 2011	3.29
The team targets a 3rd-generation con man who knows every scam in the book (because his father and grandfather practically wrote the book), and Nate decides that since they can't con him, they'll just rob him. Later, Nate learns who's been tracking them: Jack Latimer, a professional investor who's made millions off of companies who have had personnel or practices exposed by Leverage.
53	9	"The Cross My Heart Job"	P. J. Pesce	Story by : Ben Fast & Scott Wolman; Teleplay by : Jeremy Bernstein	August 21, 2011	3.03
On the way back from another job, Nate meets a nurse, and the Leverage team discovers that a terminally ill defense contractor has stolen a heart intended for a fifteen-year-old boy. To stop the contractor from getting the heart, the team has to steal the Cincinnati airport in less than two hours without any equipment while the job hits too close to home for Nate.
54	10	"The Queen's Gambit Job"	Jonathan Frakes	M. Scott Veach & Rebecca Kirsch	August 28, 2011	3.22
Sterling returns and convinces the Leverage team to steal a nuclear centrifuge calibration weight from a high-tech skyscraper in Dubai during an international chess tournament—but things may not be what they seem.
55	11	"The Experimental Job"	Marc Roskin	M. Scott Veach	November 27, 2011	2.10
The Leverage team goes back to college to investigate a program of sinister psychology research. Hardison poses as a cooler, collegiate version of himself, and Eliot goes undercover as a homeless veteran.
56	12	"The Office Job"	Jonathan Frakes	Jeremy Bernstein & Josh Schaer	December 4, 2011	1.83
A documentary film project about a small greeting-card company takes a strange turn when the Leverage team arrives, posing as efficiency experts.
57	13	"The Girls' Night Out Job"	Marc Roskin	Chris Downey & Jenn Kao	December 11, 2011	1.83
While the boys enjoy a poker night (or so they think), Parker, Sophie, and Tara investigate a mysterious handsome man who is using Parker's friend Peggy (from Season 1's "The Juror #6 Job") to get access to an embassy.
58	14	"The Boys' Night Out Job"	John Rogers	John Rogers	December 18, 2011	2.11
While the girls enjoy a night on the town (or so they think), Nate, Hardison, and Eliot must extricate their old acquaintance Hurley (from Season 1's "The 12-Step Job") from his involvement with gangs associated with the Mexican and Irish mobs.
59	15	"The Lonely Hearts Job"	Jonathan Frakes	Kerry Glover	December 25, 2011	1.99
A charity auction in the Hamptons appears to be a front for a "black widow" con, and the team's investigation puts each member's romantic skills to the test. Meanwhile, Latimer and an unknown partner declare war on Leverage.
60	16	"The Gold Job"	Marc Roskin	Joe Hortua	January 1, 2012	2.26
Taking his first turn as leader of a con, Hardison constructs an elaborate plan to victimize a pair of corrupt gold dealers.
61	17	"The Radio Job"	Dean Devlin	Chris Downey & Paul Guyot	January 8, 2012	2.32
When Jimmy Ford breaks into a patent office on a job set up by Latimer, Nate goes after him followed by the team, and they are besieged by law enforcement. All seems well until the team finds Jimmy has escaped and gone to a trap for his money. Jimmy is killed by a bomb, and Nate is caught in the bomb while he runs to Jimmy. Nate learns Latimer's partner is the team's first mark, Victor Dubenich, seeking revenge for his incarceration.
62	18	"The Last Dam Job"	Dean Devlin	John Rogers	January 15, 2012	2.55
In the wake of Jimmy Ford's death, the Leverage team must recruit allies for a final confrontation as they seek to take down both Latimer and Dubenich once and for all but Nate's own plans for the latter may have far-reaching and fatal consequences for both of them as well as the team.

=== Season 5 (2012) ===
No. overall	No. in season	Title	Directed by	Written by	Original release date	U.S. viewers (millions)
63	1	"The (Very) Big Bird Job"	John Rogers	John Rogers	July 15, 2012	3.39
As the team adjusts to their new home of Portland, Oregon, they take on the case of a corrupt airline executive (Cary Elwes) who has a strong obsession with Howard Hughes and his Spruce Goose, which is now on exhibit in a museum. Hardison and Parker reveal that they are now a couple.
64	2	"The Blue Line Job"	Marc Roskin	M. Scott Veach & Paul Guyot	July 22, 2012	2.63
The "enforcer" of a minor league hockey team may die if he brawls again, so the Leverage crew must steal his team from its unscrupulous owner.
65	3	"The First Contact Job"	Jonathan Frakes	Aaron Denius Garcia	August 5, 2012	2.61
An entrepreneur, who has made his fortune by stealing his subordinates' ideas, must be convinced by the team that he has made contact with aliens.
66	4	"The French Connection Job"	Tawnia McKiernan	Paul Guyot	August 12, 2012	2.32
The team infiltrates a cooking school run by an old friend of Eliot's and whose owner is involved in smuggling truffles; Parker looks for passion in the arts.
67	5	"The Gimme a K Street Job"	Jonathan Frakes	Jeremy Bernstein	August 19, 2012	2.39
When a cheerleader is injured through corporate negligence, Parker takes over the role of the cheerleading squad's disgraced coach while the other members of the Leverage team attempt to get safety legislation passed in Congress.
68	6	"The D.B. Cooper Job"	Marc Roskin	Chris Downey	August 26, 2012	2.62
Agent McSweeten, who still thinks that Parker and Hardison are undercover FBI, asks the team to look into the case that obsesses his dying father: the 1971 plane hijacking by D. B. Cooper.
69	7	"The Real Fake Car Job"	John Harrison	Josh Schaer	September 2, 2012	2.35
The team plans to get their client's money back by selling their mark the vintage car of his dreams. But because the mark also plans to testify against the Mob, he's been placed in Witness Protection/Relocation and is being closely guarded by a U.S. Marshal.
70	8	"The Broken Wing Job"	John Harrison	M. Scott Veach & Rebecca Kirsch	September 9, 2012	2.19
While nursing an injury, Parker comes across the planning of a crime and must recruit a reluctant waitress (Aarti Mann) to aid her in figuring out the plot. Meanwhile the rest of the team is in Japan on another job.
71	9	"The Rundown Job"	Dean Devlin	Chris Downey & Josh Schaer	September 16, 2012	2.63
After finishing a job in Washington with Parker and Hardison, Eliot gets a call from an old employer that leads him to deduce that a terror attack is imminent. Only the three of them, with the help of an old Army colleague of Eliot's, can stop it.
72	10	"The Frame Up Job"	Marc Roskin	Geoffrey Thorne & Jeremy Bernstein	September 16, 2012	2.45
With the other three team members still in Washington, Sophie sneaks off (soon followed by Nate) to the mansion of a recently deceased art collector, where a mysterious painting by a modern master will be publicly shown for the first time. When the painting turns up missing, Sophie and Nate must help Sterling solve a classic mystery to stop him from pinning the crime on them.
73	11	"The Low Low Price Job"	Tawnia McKiernan	Rebecca Kirsch	November 27, 2012	1.91
Eliot takes a personal interest in the threat posed to a small town by a new mega-store. The crew tries a variety of approaches to foil the plans of an ambitious corporate representative and keep the store from opening.
74	12	"The White Rabbit Job"	PJ Pesce	Geoffrey Thorne	December 4, 2012	2.42
A young industrialist seems bent on destroying the company his grandfather built, and the town it supports. To find out why, the team attempts the rarely (if ever) achieved "White Rabbit" con, which puts the mark through a series of simulated dreams.
75	13	"The Corkscrew Job"	Marc Roskin	Jenn Kao	December 11, 2012	2.04
To investigate a suspicious death at a winery, the team tries to get at the new owner through his wine collection.
76	14	"The Toy Job"	Jonathan Frakes	Joe Hortua	December 18, 2012	2.23
To prevent a CEO from placing an unsafe toy on the market, the team creates a craze for a competing toy.
77	15	"The Long Goodbye Job"	Dean Devlin	John Rogers & Chris Downey	December 25, 2012	3.04
The team embarks on their riskiest con yet when Nate takes a case linked to his son's death. Ellen Casey (Catherine Dent) questions Nate as he retells the job that supposedly got his entire team killed. The job was to steal "the Black Book," a record of all illegal transactions made by bankers and wealthy people that led to the 2008 financial crisis. However, it is revealed that the job was successful, the team is very much alive and Sterling (Mark Sheppard), who had been assigned to look into the break-in, allows Nate to walk away from possible imprisonment. Nate retires to marry Sophie and the team plans to start "Leverage International" with their newly obtained information. The series ends with a scene reminiscent to the closing scene of the pilot, with the team (now consisting of only Parker, Eliot, and Hardison) taking on a new case, but with Parker having replaced Nate as the leader of the Leverage team.
