= Love Song (2000 film) =

- VHS cover
- Written by: Josslyn Luckett
- Directed by: Julie Dash
- Starring: Monica; Christian Kane; Rachel True; Essence Atkins
- Music by: Frank Fitzpatrick
- Country of origin: United States
- Original language: English

Production
- Executive producers: Benny Medina; David Guillod
- Producers: Claudio Castravelli; Kimberly L. Olgetree
- Production location: Montreal
- Cinematography: David Claessen
- Editor: Pamela Malouf
- Running time: 90 minutes
- Production company: Viacom Productions

Original release
- Network: MTV
- Release: December 1, 2000

Love Song is a 2000 American romantic drama television film directed by Julie Dash and written by Josslyn Luckett. The film stars Monica, Christian Kane, Rachel True and Essence Atkins. It aired on MTV on December 1, 2000.

== Plot ==
Camille Livingston is the reserved, sheltered only child and daughter of prosperous African American parents in New Orleans. She attends school, works with under privileged inner city children and lives with her two roommates. Camille has been dating Calvin, who looks up to Camille's father and appears to be following him into medicine. It is also understood that Camille will follow Calvin and work in some type of medical field. Her life is considered by her and people around her to be "normal" and what is expected.

Then, on her 21st birthday, she is attended to at a gas station by Billy Ryan Gallo, a mechanic during the day who turns out to be a blues musician at night. When Camille shows up at Thelma's Bar later that evening, Billy formally introduces himself and then serenades her from the stage, much to her surprise and the amusement of her roommates.

Camille runs into Billy again when she is out with Calvin and Billy is playing at the restaurant/casino. Impressed with Billy's style, Calvin asks if he can buy Billy a drink and Billy joins them at their table and does not let on that he already has met Camille. After a short conversation, Billy invites both to Thelma's Bar the following evening, but Calvin declines saying he will be out of town.

The next day, Camille goes alone to Thelma's and watches again as Billy takes the stage and appears to be singing only to her. When his set is complete, Billy asks if Camille will go out and about New Orleans, a town where Camille has lived for over ten years but has never experienced. The night sees Camille and Billy visiting clubs, riding around, laughing, dancing and being very free and comfortable with each other. They then go to a club where she is handed a mic and spontaneously sings with a powerful voice that leaves Billy awed.

As the chemistry between the two heats up, Camille retreats back to her safe world and Billy, respecting her decision, asks if she would consider singing in his new band. Camille agrees and the two begin a musical friendship. They decide to try their act out at Camille's college's open mic night, with Billy playing guitar and Camille singing. During the song, Camille captures the gaze of both Billy and the audience and when the song is complete, they receive a standing ovation. Afterwards, energized by their performance, Camille stares at Billy and unexpectedly kisses him. Billy kisses her back and questions if she knows who she wants to be with. Camille confidently tells Billy she wants to be with him and the two kiss again.

With this sudden change in her life, Camille realises that she wants to continue working with the inner city children and not head off to some college to pursue a career in medicine. Newly inspired, Camille goes to tell her parents and is surprised to find Calvin and his parents at their house, with Calvin asking her to marry him. Overwhelmed by the pressure and her parents' happiness, Camille agrees to marry Calvin and opts out of her desired career choice. She then meets with Billy and displays the engagement ring. Furious with Camille for not standing up for what she wants and trying to make everyone happy but herself, Billy ends their friendship.

Two weeks later, at the engagement party, Camille's roommates observe Camille and find that their friend isn't herself and the whole event just "doesn't feel right". They take Camille aside and tell her that at any point she wants to leave, they will help drive her away.

The party is an upscale social event attended by what Calvin calls "very important people". Camille decides to serenade Calvin with a love song and everyone in the audience is amazed by her talent except for Calvin and her father, who appear to be engrossed in their own conversation. While she sings, Camille's thoughts turn to Billy as she watches Calvin ignore her performance. When the song ends, she announces to everyone that she is not in love with Calvin, but with a man who "really sees her". She calls off the engagement and drives away with her roommates.

Camille goes back to her place, changes clothes and drives to find Billy at the gas station. He is standoffish towards her and asks her to leave but she stays and shows him her bare ring finger. Billy softens, understanding the enormity of what Camille did. He questions if this is for real. She smiles and says yes, as the two kiss and hug and finally appear as a couple.

The movie ends with Camille and Billy Ryan at Thelma's Bar, this time on stage together for the first time, in front of their friends and both of their mothers, singing a love song.

== Cast ==
- Monica as Camille Livingston
- Christian Kane as Billy Ryan Gallo
- Essence Atkins as Toni
- Vanessa Bell Calloway as Evie Livingston
- Teck Holmes as Malik/Joey Anderson
- Rachel True as Renee
- Tyrese as Mad Rage/Skip
- Chilli as House Director
- Peter Francis James as Alfred Livingston
- Rainbow Sun Francks as Calvin Dumas

== Production ==
Filming took place in Montreal.

== Reception ==
In 2001, Love Song was nominated for one Black Reel Awards in the category of "Network/Cable - Best Director".
