= Incorporation =

Incorporation may refer to:

- Incorporation (business), the creation of a business or corporation
- Incorporation of a place, the creation of municipal corporation such as a city or county
- Incorporation (academic), awarding a degree based on the student having an equivalent degree from another university
- Incorporation of the Bill of Rights, extension of parts of the United States Bill of Rights to bind individual American states.
- Incorporation of international law, giving domestic legal force to a sovereign state's international legal obligations
- Incorporation of terms in English law, the inclusion of terms in contracts in such a way that the courts recognise them as valid
- Incorporation (linguistics), the compounding of a morpheme with another word or phrase
- Incorporation (Netherlands), the annexation of the Netherlands by the First French Empire

== See also ==
- Incorporation by reference
- Incorporated (disambiguation)
- Corporation
- Possession
