= Incorporated =

Incorporated may refer to:

- Incorporated community
- Incorporated (Grip Inc. album), 2004, by Grip Inc.
- Incorporated (Legion of Doom album), 2006
- Incorporated (TV series), a science fiction thriller television series set in 2075

== See also ==
- Incorporation (disambiguation)
- Unincorporated (disambiguation)
- Corporation
