= King & Maxwell =

- Genre: Drama
- Based on: King and Maxwell series by David Baldacci
- Developed by: Shane Brennan
- Starring: Jon Tenney; Rebecca Romijn; Michael O'Keefe; Chris Butler; Ryan Hurst
- Country of origin: United States
- Original language: English
- No. of seasons: 1
- No. of episodes: 10

Production
- Executive producers: Grant Anderson; Shane Brennan
- Producer: Karen Spiegel
- Production locations: Vancouver, British Columbia, Canada
- Running time: 42 minutes
- Production companies: CBS Television Studios; Shane Brennan Productions

Original release
- Network: TNT
- Release: June 10 – August 12, 2013

King & Maxwell is an American drama television series that ran on TNT from June 10 to August 12, 2013. The series featured Jon Tenney and Rebecca Romijn as Washington, D.C.–based former Secret Service agents solving crimes as private detectives. NCIS: Los Angeles creator Shane Brennan created the show based on David Baldacci's novels. On September 20, 2013, TNT canceled the series after one season.

== Cast ==
=== Main ===
- Jon Tenney as Sean King: Sean King is a former Secret Service agent who was unceremoniously fired from the Secret Service when presidential candidate Ritter (Jeff Hephner) was shot while King was on point guarding Ritter. King now runs a private detective agency with his partner Michelle Maxwell, and their (technical) assistant, Edgar. The show's opening features a short flashback of Ritter's shooting. While King does not come across as a clean freak, he frequently shows disgust with his partner Michelle's less than outstanding neatness. Usually used in some comedic fashion, King rarely has his gun, and when he does, the gun is often unloaded. King struggles with compelling his clients to pay for the group's services. Usually, he either sympathizes with his clients or he feels responsible when the client is upset with the results of King's efforts. The lack of reliable payments from clients often leads Edgar to remind King that the business needs money. Their office is away from the city, located in a lakeside beach house. King appears to have no family, except for an estranged aunt. King appears close to his partner (Maxwell) and they enjoy light teasing and casual repartee.
- Rebecca Romijn as Michelle Maxwell: Michelle Maxwell is also a former Secret Service agent who was terminated after allowing the man she was supposed to protect get kidnapped. At the start of the series, it is revealed that Maxwell's firing occurred around a year and a half prior to present day and Maxwell is still adjusting. Unlike King, Maxwell does not keep her car, work or living areas very clean or organized. Maxwell likes to keep fit and often rows a boat to the office. She has a father, with whom she shares a strained relationship, and four brothers. Following their father's example as a police captain, she and all her brothers have been or are in law enforcement. Her brother J.T. (Christian Kane) was the best of all of them and trying to look out for his maverick antics. Maxwell enjoys the banter between herself and King and the show portrays King as Maxwell's best friend.
- Ryan Hurst as Edgar Roy: Maxwell and King's assistant. Edgar is an autistic savant whose skills lie in numerical patterns and sequences, as well as high-tech maintenance and installation. He has strong hacking skills. In the pilot, we learned that Edgar was a suspected serial killer and that King lost his dearest friend and mentor as a result of taking on Edgar's case. We also learned that Edgar was not the criminal and it was revealed that Edgar was framed by a company that was the largest rival to Edgar's prior employer. After Edgar is cleared, Maxwell casually offers Edgar a job (without discussing the matter with King and the shows makes it appear that Maxwell wasn't serious about the job offer). King & Maxwell struggle with how to fire Edgar until they realize how useful his skills are. Edgar's autism makes him emotionally vulnerable when he is over-stimulated or stressed. Edgar copes with these reactions by meticulously focusing on sharpening a pencil with a hand-held sharpener. Edgar seems to greatly value his friendships, and he considers both Michelle and Sean friends. He is eager to help and is often looking for ways to please them. Edgar has one sister. He also seems to be slowly developing a closeness with Benny, a helpful former criminal, and often a source of information for Sean and the agency.
- Michael O'Keefe as FBI Agent Frank Rigby: First introduced in the beginning of the series, Agent Rigby is an FBI agent who was associated with Edgar's case. Agent Rigby does not like Sean or Michelle or their "interference" with his cases. He is a very terse individual who gives little slack to anyone. Agent Rigby is portrayed as being very difficult to please, leading to him having multiple partners. His current partner, Agent Darius Carter, seems to be Rigby's favorite partner. Agent Rigby is divorced. Rigby is behind, career-wise, in part because of his handling of a West Virginia kidnapping case in which he shot the kidnapper of a 17-year-old girl when the kidnapper was the only person to know where the kidnapped child was buried.
- Chris Butler as FBI Agent Darius Carter: Agent Rigby's partner. Agent Carter seems to be the beta between himself and his partner, and is the first to be drawn into King and Maxwell's pace, having a much more positive reaction to King and Maxwell than Agent Rigby. He more often than not plays a background role in cases, though he seems to be a good agent in his own right. At one point, he was removed from the force after he assaulted a law enforcement officer. It was later learned that the officer Carter struck was deliberately provoking him in order to get him suspended so that his confidential informant would not reveal information he had about a murder. The informant was also murdered to cover this up. Agent Carter's brother was shot by a law enforcement official after being pulled over in his car, rendering him a paraplegic. Agent Carter's memories of the event reveal his belief that his brother was unnecessarily fired on due to the law enforcement officer's racist beliefs and actions. Carter shows appreciation for their work, ethic, and assistance when they helped him with his own incident.

=== Recurring ===
- Dichen Lachman as Benny, a counterfeiter Sean helped to convict whom he now uses as a source.
- Martin Donovan as Bob Scott, a retired Secret Service agent who worked with Sean.
- Wade Sun as Wu, owner of Lucy's Cafe, which is one of Sean's favorite diners.
- Catherine Bell as Joan Dillinger, a hostage negotiator and former Secret Service agent who worked with Sean.

== Episodes ==
No.	Title	Directed by	Written by	Original release date	Prod. code	U.S. viewers (millions)
1	"Pilot"	Michael Katleman	Shane Brennan	June 10, 2013	100	3.52
Sean King and Michelle Maxwell are ex-Secret Service agents who have become private investigators after being fired from the Secret Service. When Sean's lawyer friend is killed under mysterious circumstances while representing Edgar Roy, Sean takes over the case to establish that Edgar was innocent of the crimes the feds suspected that he committed. Edgar used to work for a defense contracting company and had a high security clearance, and King was able to show that he was framed by a rival defense contractor for financial reasons.
2	"Second Chances"	Tony Wharmby	Shane Brennan	June 17, 2013	101	2.80
An assassination attempt is made on a visiting diplomat and circumstances cause Michelle to fall under suspicion for the crime. Sean serves as her lawyer to prove her innocence. Along the way, the duo dig up a possible high-level cover-up involving a young girl.
3	"Wild Card"	Paul Kaufman	Chris Downey	June 24, 2013	102	2.74
When Agent Carter's law enforcement career and life as a free man are threatened after he has a physical interaction with another law enforcement officer, King pulls the group together to help him. They learn about law enforcement corruption by officers operating with hidden agendas. In this case, they establish that certain officers were complicit in a cover-up of the murder of a female intern with a Senator's office. King & Maxwell find a key piece of evidence - missed by law enforcement - which helps solve the team's murder case as well.
4	"King's Ransom"	Dennis Smith	Shelley Meals & Darin Goldberg	July 1, 2013	104	2.78
A surprise call from Agent Rigby brings King and Maxwell on board to solve the kidnapping case of a thirteen-year-old boy. During this case, King is reintroduced to Joan Dillinger - a person from his Secret Service past - who was the hostage negotiator in this kidnapping. Separately, Edgar shares new information on the shooting of Senator Ritter (who was a presidential candidate) which led to Sean King's eviction from the Secret Service.
5	"Loved Ones"	Matt Earl Beesley	Barry O'Brien	July 8, 2013	103	2.83
After an adult child of one of King's Secret Service team-mates dies from a suspected suicide, the victim's parents ask King to investigate - believing that suicide made no sense for their son. King knew the victim's father from his days in the Secret Service and he and the victim's father, along with others, were part of a top secret mission in Mexico. King & Maxwell (with Edgar's significant help) establish that the victim did not commit suicide but was pushed off of the building's rooftop. When a second murder occurs from a bomb explosion, King concludes that the murders are tied to the team's trip to Mexico years ago, which makes him believe that he is next on the killer's list.
6	"Stealing Secrets"	Terrence O'Hara	Bret VandenBos & Brandon Willer	July 15, 2013	105	3.09
A Congressman seeks the services of King and Maxwell to investigate a tabloid blogger. Another murder leads the team to a hired hit man and unforeseen duplicity.
7	"Family Business"	Dennis Smith	Alicia Kirk	July 22, 2013	106(	3.39
Michelle's flaky brother J.T. (Christian Kane) (who has also become a PI) comes to DC to enlist the aid of King and Maxwell to help his rich client, who wants to find a man he believes to be a con artist who wants to marry his daughter. His daughter, meanwhile, hires King and Maxwell to prove that the love of her life is just who he appears to be. As they dig deeper into the case they realize someone else is also after the man they are looking for.
8	"Job Security"	Jonathan Frakes	Scott Sullivan	July 29, 2013	107	3.14
King and Maxwell are emotionally swayed to take a case to retrieve a cell phone for an elderly man, only to find out that the phone was not for the man, but for the Deputy Director of National Intelligence for infidelity photos in its memory which, due to a shyster lawyer, is being offered up to a drug cartel for information along with a video that might help the suit of a POW whose son was suing for benefits from his fathers return. For her troubles, the Deputy offers to help Michelle get her job back. Sean is secretly given more direction in his investigation of Ritter's assassination by Jose Alverado.
9	"Locked In"	Kate Woods	Gregory Weidman	August 5, 2013	109	3.25
Agent Rigby is charged with protecting and escorting a witness carefully by an angry superior, to an important case, and while Michelle and Sean are there to ask for a favor, the witness is killed. With the building on lock down, King and Maxwell agree to help him with his case, to find the shooter and another witness to testify against the corporation. All the while, Sean finds out Michelle has reapplied to the Secret Service, having been accepted, and is thinking about going back in. Sean also inches closer to the evidence from Ritter's shooting.
10	"Pandora's Box"	James Whitmore Jr.	Chris Downey	August 12, 2013	108	3.50
Sean mysteriously receives the FBI evidence box in the mail from the Ritter assassination that caused him to lose his career in the Secret Service. (At the end after Michelle had returned the box to Agent Rigby with "no questions asked", an interaction between Rigby and a wounded Sean implies that Rigby may have been the mysterious source that mailed it to him.) While going to her reinstatement interview for the Secret Service, Michelle detours to photograph some info on file from a secretive past assignment in Mexico both Sean King and Bob Scott never spoke of in detail. That information with the evidence from the FBI evidence box results in Sean's preventing another assassination, this time of Ritter's son, now running for Congress. Catherine Bell returns as Joan Dillinger (see episode 4), now head of the security agency hired by Ritter's son for his event to announce his run for Congress in the same location where his father had been assassinated eight years previously. Without revealing the exact details of the solution here, the season finale thus solves the mystery of how Sean's Secret Service career ended as a result of a conspiracy to assassinate Ritter's father, a conspiracy that attempted to assassinate son Ritter in this episode. However, the episode ends on a cliffhanger regarding who was actually behind that assassination.

== Broadcast ==
In Australia the series airs on SoHo, premiering April 8, 2014.

== Home media ==
Name	Region 1	Region 2	Region 4	Discs
King & Maxwell: The Complete Series	February 5, 2015	N/A	N/A	2
