= Christian Kane =

American actor and musician

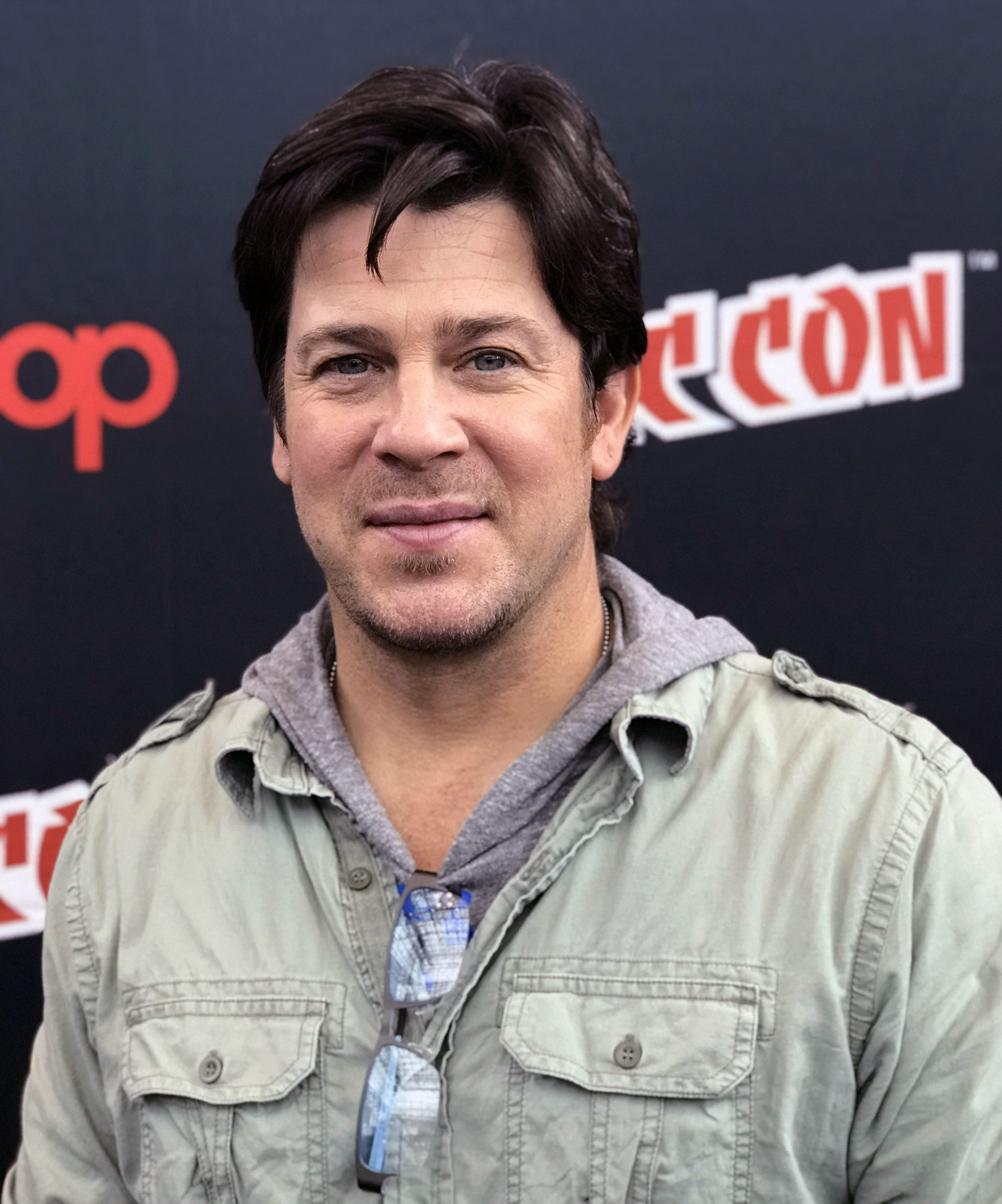
- Kane at the 2017 New York Comic Con
- Born: Dallas, Texas, U.S.
- Occupations: Actor; singer-songwriter
- Years active: 1997–present
- Website: christiankane.com

Christian Kane is an American actor and singer-songwriter. His television roles include Lindsey McDonald in Angel, Eliot Spencer in Leverage and its revival Leverage: Redemption, Jacob Stone in The Librarians and its spinoff sequel series The Librarians: The Next Chapter (2014-2018; 2025–present), and Abe "High Wolf" Wheeler in Into the West. His cinematic filmography includes Just Married, Taxi, Love Song and Secondhand Lions.

Kane is the lead singer of the country-southern rock band Kane. On December 7, 2010, they released The House Rules, their third album and their debut for record label Bigger Picture Music Group. The album reached no. 25 on the Billboard Country Albums chart. The first single from the album, also titled "The House Rules", debuted at no. 54 on the Billboard Country Songs chart. The second single, “Let Me Go”, was released on July 11, 2011.

== Early life ==
Kane has stated that he is Cherokee (Native American). His parents participated in, and met at, the rodeo. The family moved around the South because his father was in the oil business, and they finally settled in Norman, Oklahoma, when Kane was in eighth grade. While growing up in Texas and Oklahoma, Kane was a collegiate-style wrestler and played football (as a strong safety). He studied art history at the University of Oklahoma, but decided he wanted to be an actor and headed to Los Angeles before finishing the degree. In Los Angeles, he worked at a talent management company, where he delivered scripts in exchange for getting acting jobs.

== Career ==
=== Acting ===
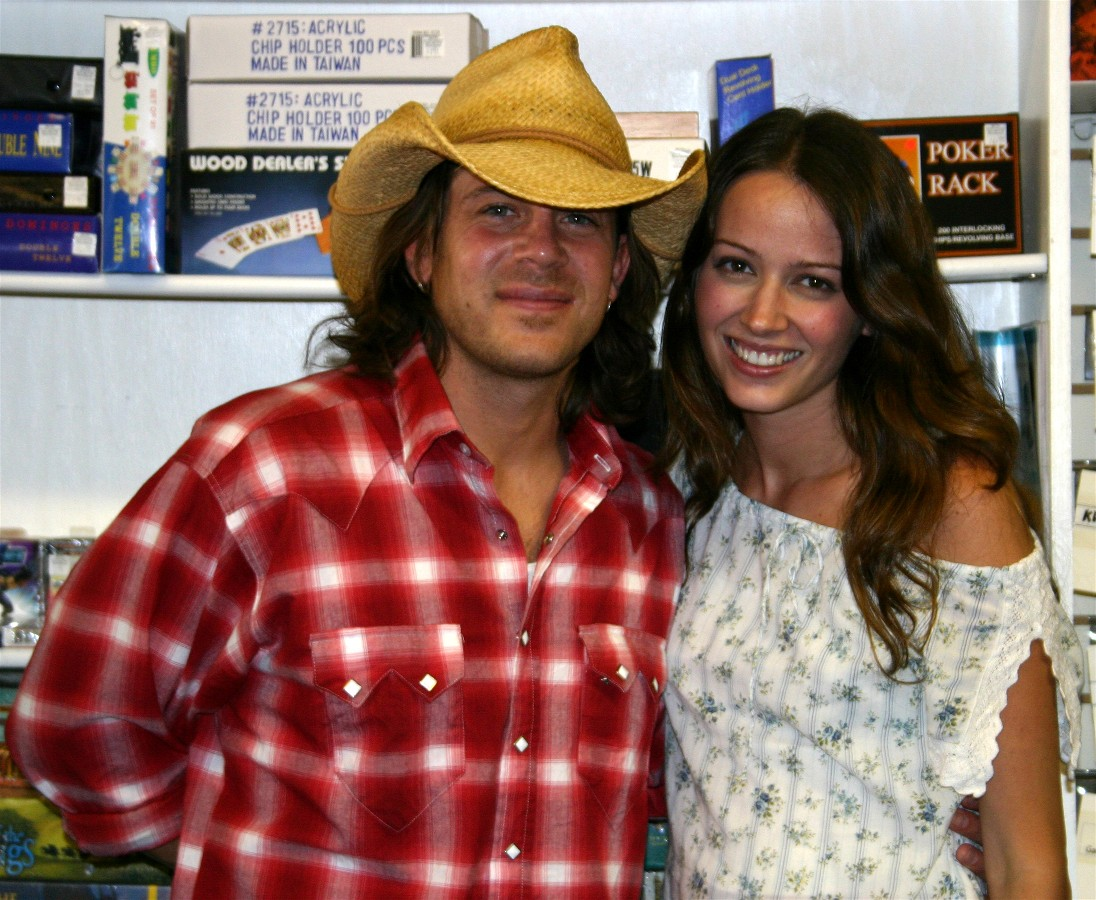
Kane with Amy Acker at a signing in Santa Barbara (2004)

Kane landed his first acting role in 1997 as one of the leads in MGM's television series Fame L.A. playing a country singer who moved to Los Angeles from Kansas. His television roles have included a recurring role in Joss Whedon’s Angel as the lawyer Lindsey MacDonald, the Jerry Bruckheimer-produced series Close to Home on CBS, the TNT television film Crossfire Trail in which he appeared with Tom Selleck, and the role of Abe Wheeler in the Steven Spielberg-produced 2005 miniseries Into the West. He starred as Billy Ryan in the MTV movie Love Song in 2000, alongside R&B artist Monica.

Kane’s appearances on the big screen include the 20th Century Fox film Just Married and New Line Cinema's Secondhand Lions (as the younger version of Robert Duvall's Hub McCann). He has a scar on his upper lip from an injury he received while filming the movie. He also appeared in Taxi, Life or Something Like It, the Peter Berg-directed Friday Night Lights, and the Warner Bros. baseball film Summer Catch.

In 2007, Kane was featured in the Carrie Underwood music video "So Small", playing the role of one of the three converging stories. In 2009, he appeared in the psychological thriller Hide, in which he played the lead role of Billy, and in The Donner Party, which is based on the true story of the Donner Party. In 2010, he starred in the romantic drama Not Since You.

From 2008 to 2012, Kane appeared on the TNT television series Leverage as Eliot Spencer, a retrieval specialist and black ops soldier who teams up with four other specialists to undo injustices perpetrated upon the helpless. Kane performed all his own fight scenes and also choreographed fights for the series. Kane plays the same character in Leverage:Redemption, which premiered in July 2021, streaming on IMDb TV. The show takes up the team's adventures 8 years after the last episode of the original series.

In 2013, Kane appeared as JT Maxwell, brother to Rebecca Romijn's female lead Michelle Maxwell on TNT's King & Maxwell. He appeared again with Romijn, co-starring in the 2014 to 2018 TNT television series The Librarians, based on The Librarian film series.

In 2020, Kane starred as Alex Walker on the drama series Almost Paradise. The second season was released in July 2023. In an interview with Tell-Tale TV, Kane described that character as being several of his previous roles on other series rolled into one.

=== Music ===
The band consists of Kane (lead vocals, guitar), Steve Carlson (rhythm guitar, backing vocals), Jason Southard (lead guitar), Will Amend (bass guitar), and Ryan Baker (drums) and is signed to independent record label Bigger Picture Music Group. Their label debut, The House Rules, was released on December 7, 2010. It debuted at no. 1 on the Billboard Heatseekers album chart and no. 25 on the Country Albums chart. The album was produced by Bob Ezrin and Jimmie Lee Sloas.

The first single from the album, also titled "The House Rules", debuted at no. 54 on the Billboard Country Songs chart and was the seventh-most added song on Mediabase Country stations on its official impact date. The video for the single was directed by Timothy Hutton and premiered on CMT's Big New Music Weekend October 1, 2010. "The House Rules" was featured in the video game NASCAR 09. The second single, "Let Me Go", was released on July 11, 2011. The video for the single, directed by Roman White, premiered on CMT August 8, 2011 and reached no. 1 on their Today's Top Videos chart .

Trace Adkins released a song written by Kane called "Happy Man" on his 2010 album, Cowboy's Back in Town.

Kane's co-writing efforts include songs written with Blair Daly, Brett James, David Lee Murphy, Casey Beathard, and Jerrod Niemann. "Thinking of You", a song he co-wrote with Blair Daly, was featured in Leverage Season 3 episode 6, "The Studio Job."

== Filmography ==
=== Film ===
Year	Title	Role	Notes
1999	EDtv	P.A.	
2000	The Broken Hearts Club: A Romantic Comedy	Idaho guy	
2000	Love Song	Billy Ryan Gallo	
2001	Crossfire Trail	John Thomas "J.T." Langston	
2001	Summer Catch	Dale Robin	
2002	Life or Something Like It	Cal Cooper	
2003	Just Married	Peter Prentiss	
2003	Secondhand Lions	Young Hub	
2004	The Plight of Clownana	Christian	Short film
2004	Taxi	Agent Mullins	
2004	Friday Night Lights	Brian	
2005	Her Minor Thing	Paul	
2005	Keep Your Distance	Sean Voight	
2007	Four Sheets to the Wind	David	
2008	Hide	Billy	
2009	The Donner Party	Charles Stanton	
2009	Not Since You	Ryan Roberts	
2011	Good Day for It	Dale Acton	
2011	Universal Squadrons	Peacemaker	
2014	50 to 1	Mark Allen	
2014	All Stars	Jim Hall	
2017	The Terror of Hallow's Eve	Bobby	
2017	Tinker	Boudreaux	Post-production
2017	Christmas in the Heartland	Jeff Gentry	
2018	Junkie	Sheriff Corbin	

=== Television ===
Year	Title	Role	Notes
1997–1998	Fame L.A.	Ryan "Flyboy" Legget	Main cast
1999	Rescue 77	Wick Lobo	Main cast
1999–2004	Angel	Lindsey McDonald	Recurring role
2001	Dawson's Creek	Nick Taylor	Episode: "The Tao of Dawson"
2003	The Crooked E: The Unshredded Truth About Enron	Brian Cruver	TV movie
2004	Las Vegas	Bob	Episode: "The Strange Life of Bob"
2005	Into the West	Abe High Wolf Wheeler	Miniseries
2005–2006	Close to Home	Jack Chase	Main cast
2008–2012	Leverage	Eliot Spencer	Main cast
2013	King & Maxwell	JT Maxwell	Episode: "Family Business"
2014–2018	The Librarians	Jacob Stone	Main cast Nominated – Saturn Award for Best Supporting Actor on Television
2016	Heaven Sent	Billy Taylor	TV movie
2018	S.W.A.T.	Mr. X	Episode "S.O.S."
2019	Supernatural	Lee Webb	Episode: "Last Call"
2020–2023	Almost Paradise	Alex Walker	Main cast
2021–2025	Leverage: Redemption	Eliot Spencer	Main cast
2025	The Librarians: The Next Chapter	Jacob Stone	Guest cast

=== Video game ===
Year	Title	Voice role
2006	24: The Game	Peter Madsen

== Discography ==
=== Soundtrack ===
Title	Song(s) featured
Angel (2001)	"L.A. Song"
Life or Something Like It (2002)	"Sweet Carolina Rain" (as KANE)
The Crooked E: The Unshredded Truth About Enron TV (2003)	"More Than I Deserve" (as KANE)
Just Married (2003)	"The Chase" (as KANE)
Leverage — "The Two Horse Job" (2008)	"More Than I Deserve" (as KANE)
NASCAR 09 (2008)	"The House Rules" (as Christian Kane)
Keep Your Distance (2005)	"Right In Front Of You" (as Sean Voight/KANE)
Leverage — "The Studio Job" (2010)	"Thinking of You"
Supernatural — "Last Call" (2019)	"The House Rules" (as Lee Webb/Christian Kane)
Supernatural — "Last Call" (2019)	"Good Ol' Boys" by Waylon Jennings (as Lee Webb/Christian Kane); *Sung with Dean Winchester/Jensen Ackles

=== Studio albums ===
Title	Album details	Peak chart positions		
Title	Album details	US Country	US	US Heat
Kane	Release date: 2001; Label: self-released; Formats: CD; Re-release date: July 22, 2002; Label: self-released; Formats: Multimedia Enhanced CD	—	—	—
The House Rules	Release date: December 7, 2010; Label: Bigger Picture Music Group; Formats: CD, music download	25	178	1
"—" denotes releases that did not chart

=== Extended plays ===
Title	Album details	Peak chart positions		
Title	Album details	US Country	US	US Heat
Christian Kane (aka American Made 5-Song EP)	Release date: March 9, 2010; Label: Outlaw Saints Music / Bigger Picture Music Group; Formats: CD, music download	28	159	5

=== Live albums ===
Title	Album details
Acoustic Live In London!	Release date: October 2005; Label: self-released; Formats: CD

=== Singles ===
Year	Single	Peak positions	Album
Year	Single	US Country	Album
2010	"The House Rules"	49	The House Rules
2011	"Let Me Go"	58	The House Rules

=== Music videos ===
Year	Video	Director
2010	"The House Rules"	Timothy Hutton
2011	"Let Me Go"	Roman White
