= Beth Riesgraf =

American actress

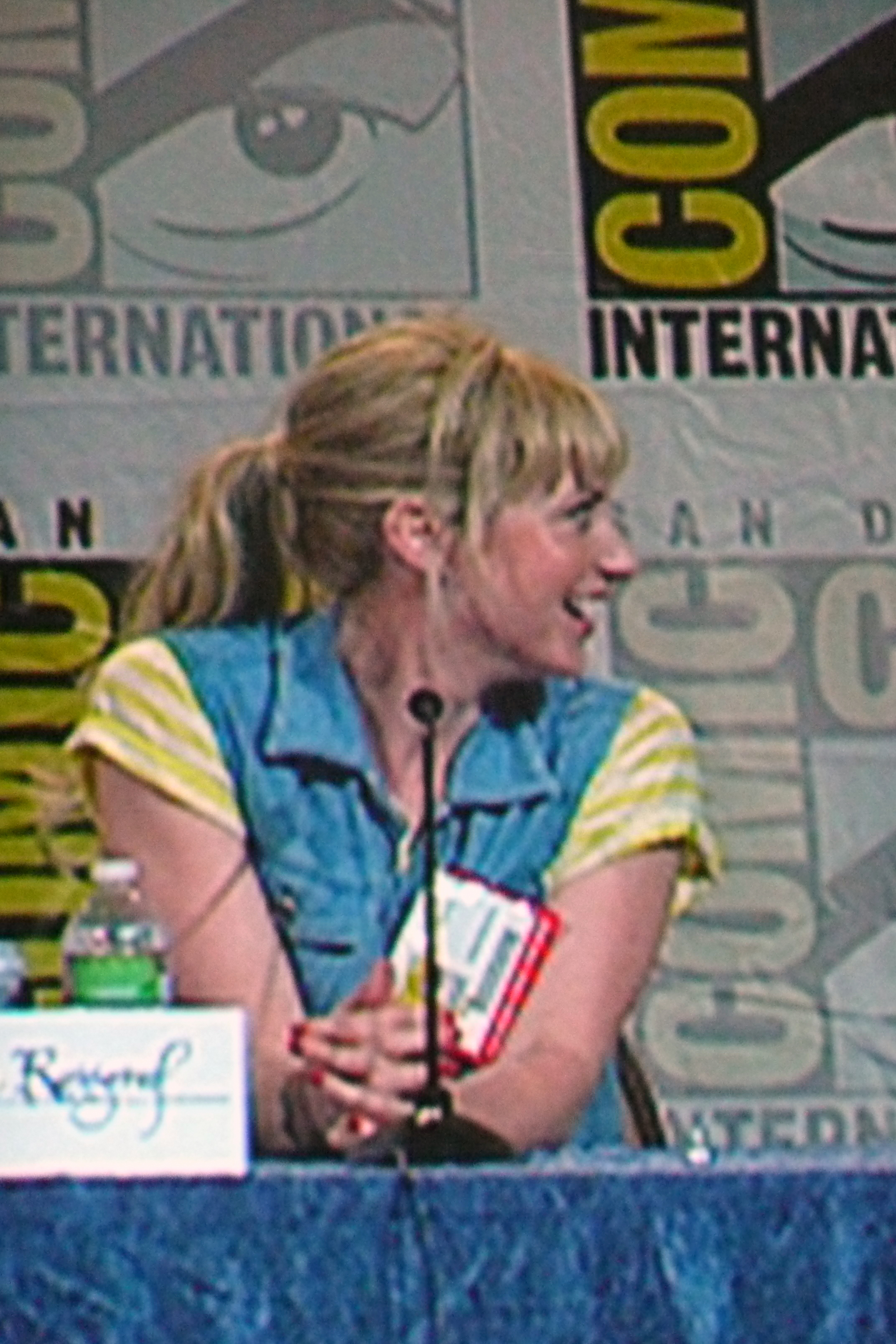
- Riesgraf at the 2010 San Diego Comic-Con
- Born: August 24, 1978 (age 48); Belle Plaine, Minnesota, U.S.
- Occupation: Actress
- Years active: 2001–present
- Partner: Jason Lee (2001–2007)
- Children: 1

Beth Riesgraf (born August 24, 1978) is an American actress and television director. She is known for her portrayal of Parker on the TNT television series Leverage (2008–2012) and the revival Leverage: Redemption (2021–2025) on Amazon Prime.

== Early life and education ==
Originally from Belle Plaine, Minnesota, Riesgraf graduated from Cimarron-Memorial High School in Las Vegas, Nevada in 1996.

== Career ==
Riesgraf appeared with then-fiancé Jason Lee as the character Natalie Duckworth on the show My Name Is Earl in 2005 and 2007, and in Tim Hill's film Alvin and the Chipmunks as a mother in the supermarket in 2007. In 2008, she played the bride in the official music video for "Cath..." by Death Cab for Cutie.

From 2008 to 2012, she played the main role of Parker in the TNT series Leverage. In 2013, she guest-starred on Criminal Minds in the episode titled "Zugzwang" as Dr. Maeve Donovan, Dr. Spencer Reid's secretive girlfriend. In 2015, Riesgraf starred in the USA Network series Complications, which follows a morally conflicted doctor's life; the show lasted for one season. In September 2019, she was cast in a starring role in the Paramount Network drama series 68 Whiskey. Between 2021 and 2025, Riesgraf reprised her role as Parker in Leverage: Redemption, a revival of the original Leverage series.

== Personal life ==
Riesgraf was engaged to actor Jason Lee. Together they had a son.

== Filmography ==
=== Film ===
Year	Title	Role	Notes
2002	Scorcher	Krissy	
2003	I Love Your Work	Swoosh Photographer	
2007	Alvin and the Chipmunks	Mother in Store	
2009	Nobody	Edie	
2015	Intruders	Anna Rook	
2017	In Search of Fellini	Sylvia	
2019	I Hate Kids	Schyler	

=== Television ===
Year	Title	Role	Notes
2001	Spin City	Waitress	Episode: "Trainstopping"
2001	Undressed	Loretta	Main role (season 4)
2005	How I Met Your Mother	Works with Carlos Girl	Episode: "Purple Giraffe"
2005	The Stereo Sound Agency	Various	Television film
2005, 2007	My Name Is Earl	Natalie Duckworth	Episodes: "Faked My Own Death," "Our 'Cops' Is On!"
2007	Insatiable	N/A	Unsold television pilot
2007	Big Shots	James' Date	Episode: "The Good, the Bad, and the Really Ugly"
2007	Without a Trace	Kelly Schmidt	Episode: "Run"
2008–2012	Leverage	Parker	Main role, 77 episodes
2011	NCIS	Maxine / Max Destructo	Episode: "Kill Screen"
2012–2013, 2017, 2020	Criminal Minds	Dr. Maeve Donovan	Recurring role, 6 episodes
2013	The Mentalist	Kira Tinsley	Episode: "The Red Tattoo"
2013	The Surgeon General	Dr. Page Wyatt	Television film
2014	Killer Women	Jennifer Jennings	Episode: "Some Men Need Killing"
2014	Perception	Ashley Marcel	Episode: "Cobra"
2014	Caper	Alexia	Web series
2015	Complications	Samantha Ellison	Main role
2015	The Librarians	Lady of the Lake	Episodes: "And the Cost of Education," "And the Final Curtain"
2018	SEAL Team	Cindy	Episode: "Getaway Day"
2019	Stranger Things	Billy's mom	Episodes: "Chapter Six: E Pluribus Unum," "Chapter Eight: The Battle of Starcourt"
2019	Lovestruck	Isabelle	Television film
2020	Legends of Tomorrow	Kathy Meyers	Episode: "Slay Anything"
2020	68 Whiskey	Major Sonia Holloway	Main role
2021-2025	Leverage: Redemption	Parker	Main role, also director

=== Director ===
Year	Title	Notes
2021–2025	Leverage: Redemption	Episodes: "The Bucket Job," "The Great Train Job," "The Tournament Job", "The Turkish Prisoner Job", "The Shakedown in Clone Town Job".
2023	It Is What It Is	Short film; won several awards from the Independent Shorts Awards
2011	A Standard Story	Short film.
2020	Mail Companion	Short

== Accolades ==
Year	Association	Category	Nominated work	Result	Ref(s)
2011	Saturn Awards	Best Supporting Actress on Television	Leverage	Nominated	
2012	Saturn Awards	Best Supporting Actress on Television	Leverage	Nominated	
2013	Saturn Awards	Best Supporting Actress on Television	Leverage	Nominated	
2022	Saturn Awards	Best Actress in a Streaming Television Series	Leverage: Redemption	Nominated	
