= Leverage: Redemption =

2021 television series

- Genre: Action; Crime
- Created by: John Rogers; Chris Downey
- Starring: Gina Bellman; Christian Kane; Beth Riesgraf; Aleyse Shannon; Noah Wyle
- Country of origin: United States
- Original language: English
- No. of seasons: 3
- No. of episodes: 39

Production
- Executive producers: Dean Devlin; Marc Roskin; Rachel Olschan-Wilson; Kate Rorick
- Production companies: Kung Fu Monkey Productions; Electric Entertainment; Amazon MGM Studios

Original release
- Network: Amazon Freevee
- Release: July 9, 2021 – January 24, 2023
- Network: Amazon Prime Video
- Release: April 17 – June 5, 2025

Related
- Leverage

Leverage: Redemption is an American action and crime drama television revival of Leverage with most of the main cast returning. The first eight episodes premiered on Amazon Freevee on July 9, 2021, with an additional eight episodes released on October 8, 2021. In December 2021, the series was renewed for a second season. The second season began airing on November 15, 2022. In December 2023, the series was renewed for a third season and moved to Amazon Prime Video. The third season premiered on April 17, 2025. The series was canceled by Amazon in December 2025.

== Premise ==
A year after the death of Nate Ford, his widow, Sophie Devereaux, reunites with their former crew: Eliot Spencer, Alec Hardison, and Parker. They meet Harry Wilson, a crooked lawyer searching for redemption, and help him to con one of his amoral clients. After the job, Harry convinces the team to stick together and return to "picking up where the law leaves off" while he tries to return to the side of good. The team is also joined by Hardison's foster sister, Breanna Casey, who takes Hardison's place on the crew while Hardison works with a dozen subsidiary Leverage operations and various pro-democracy and non-profit organizations around the world. The team opens a new Leverage Consulting office in New Orleans and continues working to take down rich criminals and help those who need their particular brand of justice.

== Cast and characters ==
=== Main ===
- Gina Bellman as Sophie Devereaux – the team's grifter and new mastermind. She is a multilingual Briton skilled in the use of accents who dreamed of becoming a legitimate actress. She retired along with the team's original mastermind, former insurance investigator Nathan "Nate" Ford (Timothy Hutton), at the end of the original Leverage and the two got married. Still struggling in the wake of his passing, she finds new purpose by leading the team in his stead.
- Christian Kane as Eliot Spencer – the team's hitter. Since the ending of the original series, Eliot has spent his spare time working with veterans and giving them jobs with his food truck chain, Brick & Basil. His food trucks also serve as mobile command centers for the team's jobs.
- Beth Riesgraf as Parker – the team's thief and former mastermind following Nate and Sophie's retirement. Having become bored with the managerial duties of running the various Leverage teams around the world, she happily cedes the mastermind role to Sophie to return to being a thief, though she still does grifting roles in the jobs when necessary. She is still romantically involved with Hardison and has also taken on the role of mentoring Breanna in Hardison's absence.
- Aleyse Shannon as Breanna Casey – Hardison's foster sister and the team's new hacker, tech master, and maker. Though not as skilled a hacker as her brother, she is a gifted engineer with a talent for physical builds. She also desires to learn other skills from the team, having grown up on the stories of their exploits.
- Noah Wyle as Harry Wilson (seasons 1–2; recurring season 3) – The team's fixer and a former corporate lawyer for the kinds of shady people the team targets until his wife and daughter left him because of his work. He now seeks to redeem himself and become the kind of man his daughter can be proud of. Wyle's appearances were limited for the third season because of his shooting schedule for The Pitt.

=== Recurring ===
- Aldis Hodge as Alec Hardison – the team's original hacker. Following the ending of the original series, he has lent his technical skills to various pro-democracy and humanitarian organizations around the globe. With Eliot's encouragement, Hardison continues his work, as he is uniquely qualified to do so, and leaves his role to his foster sister, Breanna, although he occasionally returns to assist the team. He maintains his romantic relationship with Parker.
  - Hodge's appearances were limited because of his shooting schedule for City on a Hill, Black Adam, and Cross.
- Andrea Navedo as U.S. Marshal Maria Shipp (season 1) – a no nonsense law enforcement officer whose assignments occasionally bring her into contact with the team. She begins a romantic relationship with Eliot.
- Lucy Taylor as Alexandra Bligh – a high-ranking member of RIZ, a private security company that engages in clandestine operations around the world and who the Leverage team sometimes encounters on their jobs. Their firm was among Harry's former clients.
- Keith David as Billy Spencer – Eliot's estranged adoptive father. He and Eliot fell out after Eliot joined the military and missed his mother's funeral but they are making an effort to reconnect as a family.
- Alexandra Park as Astrid Pickford – Sophie's step-daughter and a talented investigator for Interpol. She and Parker consider each other nemeses.
- Auden Wyle as Becky Wilson – Harry Wilson's daughter. Auden Wyle is the real-life daughter of Noah Wyle, who plays Harry.

Returning from Prior Series

- Drew Powell as Jack Hurley – a former accountant and previous mark of the team who later befriended them and joined one of their crews.
- Jeri Ryan as Tara Cole - Sophie's former partner, a grifter who has aided the team on prior jobs.

=== Guest ===
- LeVar Burton as Mr. Blanche
- Jack Coleman as "Arizona Mike"
- Craig Frank as Clyde Bruster
- Rachael Harris as Judge Marlene Gannon
- Julie Ivey as Ethel
- Annet Mahendru as Reena Trivedi
- John Charles Meyer as Jack
- Maulik Pancholy as Neal Trivedi
- Cedric Yarbrough as Mayor Armond Bruster

== Episodes ==
| Season | Episodes | | Originally released | | |
| Season | Episodes | | First released | Last released | Network |
|---|---|---|---|---|---|
| 1 | 16 | 8 | July 9, 2021 | | Amazon Freevee |
| 1 | 16 | 8 | October 8, 2021 | | Amazon Freevee |
| 2 | 13 | | November 15, 2022 | January 24, 2023 | Amazon Freevee |
| 3 | 10 | | April 17, 2025 | June 5, 2025 | Amazon Prime Video |

=== Season 1 (2021) ===
| No. overall | No. in season | Title | Directed by | Written by | Original release date |
|---|---|---|---|---|---|
Part 1
| 1 | 1 | "The Too Many Rembrandts Job" | Dean Devlin | Teleplay by : John Rogers & Chris Downey; Story by : Dean Devlin and John Rogers & Chris Downey | July 9, 2021 |
When the team comes together on the anniversary of Nate's death to help Sophie, they intercept guilt-ridden corporate fixer Harry and decide to help him take down an evil billionaire making money on the back of an opioid crisis. Special guest star: Aldis Hodge
| 2 | 2 | "The Panamanian Monkey Job" | Dean Devlin | John Rogers & Chris Downey | July 9, 2021 |
With a new team member on board plus the arrival of Hardison’s genius foster sister, the team heads to Panama to pull an elaborate heist before an evil billionaire can get his money and flee to a non-extradition country. Special guest star: Aldis Hodge
| 3 | 3 | "The Rollin' on the River Job" | Marc Roskin | Jill Weinberger | July 9, 2021 |
The Leverage team takes on a greedy riverboat casino owner, before he can bulldoze the homes of longtime New Orleans natives for his planned expansion.
| 4 | 4 | "The Tower Job" | Noah Wyle | Marque Franklin-Williams & John Timothy | July 9, 2021 |
One member of the team seeks redemption and justice by convincing Leverage to con a developer out of an entire luxury apartment building.
| 5 | 5 | "The Paranormal Hacktivity Job" | Marc Roskin | Alayna Heim & Josh Schaer | July 9, 2021 |
When a woman believes she is being haunted and runs from her home in terror, Sophie leads Breanna and Parker through a con to convince the two real estate scammers responsible to target Leverage HQ.
| 6 | 6 | "The Card Game Job" | Francis Dela Torre | Teagan Wall & Matt Okumura | July 9, 2021 |
The Leverage team dives into the world of a high fantasy collectible card game with a devoted following to take down a pharmaceutical bad boy who is price-gouging drugs to fund his own house of cards.
| 7 | 7 | "The Double-Edged Sword Job" | Jonathan Frakes | Marque Franklin-Williams | July 9, 2021 |
The team takes on a brilliant software developer who is selling a groundbreaking facial recognition system that threatens everyone’s privacy except his own.
| 8 | 8 | "The Mastermind Job" | Dean Devlin | Josh Schaer | July 9, 2021 |
Sophie must keep her feelings in check when she discovers that someone has written a memoir of the team, casting himself as Nate – which leads an exiled criminal to kidnap Harry and “Fake Nate,” forcing the Leverage team to pull a heist.
Part 2
| 9 | 9 | "The Bucket Job" | Beth Riesgraf | Chris Downey & Jill Weinberger | October 8, 2021 |
The Leverage team's holiday good deed goes awry when their attempt to give a small-town librarian the spy-thriller adventure of a lifetime is interrupted by a shadowy spy organization.
| 10 | 10 | "The Unwellness Job" | Noah Wyle | Alayna Heim & Josh Schaer | October 8, 2021 |
The Leverage team sets out to discredit a lifestyle and wellness guru targeting desperate people and peddling snake oil instead of actual medicine.
| 11 | 11 | "The Jackal Job" | Marc Roskin | Chris Downey | October 8, 2021 |
The Leverage team explores the failing memory of a legendary grifter to try and find her greatest score before her abusive Elder Guardian gets his hands on it and takes over her life.
| 12 | 12 | "The Golf Job" | Noah Wyle | Christine Boylan | October 8, 2021 |
An old friend visits, sparking a self-doubting Harry to uncover an unlikely client on the link at his exclusive golf club.
| 13 | 13 | "The Hurricane Job" | Marc Roskin | Josh Schaer | October 8, 2021 |
Stuck together during a massive hurricane, Eliot and Parker must stop a band of corrupt cops who have taken over a small hotel, and find what the cops are searching for, before it's too late.
| 14 | 14 | "The Great Train Job" | Beth Riesgraf | Matt Okumura & Teagan Wall | October 8, 2021 |
Two local farmers are targeted by a hate group, but something more poisonous on the farm leads Team Leverage to a crooked green energy innovator and an old-fashioned Train Heist.
| 15 | 15 | "The Muddy Waters Job" | Marc Roskin | John Timothy | October 8, 2021 |
The Leverage team infiltrates an oil rig and a small-town trial to find evidence that a corrupt oil CEO is hiding a dangerous oil leak in the gulf, causing illnesses along the spill zone.
| 16 | 16 | "The Harry Wilson Job" | Dean Devlin | John Rogers & Kate Rorick | October 8, 2021 |
The team has to infiltrate the shadowy R.I.Z. to stop it from unleashing a worm that can take down the entire USA electrical grid, and they must use Harry to do it. Special guest star: Aldis Hodge

=== Season 2 (2022–23) ===
| No. overall | No. in season | Title | Directed by | Written by | Original release date |
|---|---|---|---|---|---|
| 17 | 1 | "The Debutante Job" | Dean Devlin | John Rogers & Kate Rorick | November 15, 2022 |
Hardison enlists the team's help to rescue a pro-democracy activist from a dictator in hiding by infiltrating his teenage daughter's debutante ball but clashes arise between Hardison's methods and Breanna's. Special guest star: Aldis Hodge
| 18 | 2 | "The One Man's Trash Job" | Marc Roskin | Josh Schaer | November 15, 2022 |
While trying to take down a corrupt businessman whose illegal trash dumping is ruining a family owned shrimping business, Sophie runs across an old colleague of hers, Arthur Wilde (Damian O'Hare), working for the mark.
| 19 | 3 | "The Tournament Job" | Beth Riesgraf | Chuck Maa & Mel Cowan | November 15, 2022 |
The team infiltrates the world of e-sports to rescue a young gamer with a medical condition from his abusive coach, who is pumping him full of dangerous performance enhancers.
| 20 | 4 | "The Date Night Job" | Marc Roskin | Jill Weinberger | November 22, 2022 |
The team arrange a heist at a freeport for Parker and Hardison's date night but accidentally get caught up trying to prevent the kidnapping of a young heir to a massive art collection. Special guest star: Aldis Hodge
| 21 | 5 | "The Walk in the Woods Job" | Noah Wyle | Noah Wyle | November 29, 2022 |
When an old friend of Eliot's is seemingly killed in an explosion, the team helps him by infiltrating a secret society in order to take down the corrupt head of a private security firm.
| 22 | 6 | "The Fractured Job" | Dean Devlin | Dean Devlin & Alayna Heim | December 6, 2022 |
The team joins Eliot in his hometown and help take down a corrupt fracking operation that is threatening his estranged father. Special guest stars: Aldis Hodge & Keith David
| 23 | 7 | "The Big Rig Job" | Melina Govich | Danielle Nicki | December 13, 2022 |
When a struggling trucker gets cheated out of his rig close to Christmas, the team plan to take down the siblings who own the trucking company and are ruining their father's legacy.
| 24 | 8 | "The Turkish Prisoner Job" | Beth Riesgraf | Chris Downey | December 20, 2022 |
Harry plays mastermind on a job when corrupt cops frame an innocent man in order to roll up properties for a powerful real estate developer.
| 25 | 9 | "The Pyramid Job" | Noah Wyle | Chuck Maa & Mel Cowan | December 27, 2022 |
An old friend of Sophie's enlists the team to rescue his daughter from a husband and wife team running a complex pyramid scheme.
| 26 | 10 | "The Work Study Job" | Marshall Tyler | Teagan Wall | January 3, 2023 |
Breanna passionately works to help a grad student whose groundbreaking research was stolen by her teacher, Dr. Daniel Gray (Rob Benedict), a world renowned physicist, and drags the rest of the team along for the ride. Special guest star: Aldis Hodge
| 27 | 11 | "The Belly of the Beast Job" | Milena Govich | Jill Weinberger | January 10, 2023 |
Told entirely from the point of view of "civilian" employee Jenna, the episode follows her and IT worker Keith as they are helped by the team behind the scenes (unbeknownst to them) to take down a corrupt music producer, Hank Hogan (Jeffrey Vincent Parise), who is sexually assaulting his employees and then bribing or bullying them into silence.
| 28 | 12 | "The Museum Makeover Job" | Marc Roskin | Josh Schaer | January 17, 2023 |
The team get called to London to foil a museum robbery being planned by Sophie's former mentor, Ramsey, and once again cross paths with Arthur Wilde.
| 29 | 13 | "The Crowning Achievement Job" | Marc Roskin | Kate Rorick | January 24, 2023 |
Sophie and the crew work to escape the museum and take down Arthur Wilde once and for all. Special guest star: Aldis Hodge

=== Season 3 (2025) ===
| No. overall | No. in season | Title | Directed by | Written by | Original release date |
|---|---|---|---|---|---|
| 30 | 1 | "The Weekend In Paris Job" | Marc Roskin | John Rogers | April 17, 2025 |
On the run from a busted heist in Paris, the Leverage team finds themselves taking shelter among oligarchs auctioning off their home nations’ precious resources. On the fly they have to create an entirely new con to take down the group’s ringleader and save a well-intentioned activist. Special guest stars: Aldis Hodge & Noah Wyle
| 31 | 2 | "The Digital Frankenstein Job" | Valerie Weiss | Chris Downey & Jacky Watson | April 17, 2025 |
The team conducts a sting to snare a corrupt judge by using the perfect undercover briber - a completely virtual tech visionary generated by A.I. - only to watch as their “Digital Frankenstein” quickly spins out of control. Special guest stars: Noah Wyle & Rachel Harris
| 32 | 3 | "The Scared Stiff Job" | Jonathan Frakes | Jamey Perry | April 17, 2025 |
A morally ambiguous CEO has found a way to exploit people's death using cryonics. The team runs a con on the CEO in an attempt to change his ways. Special guest stars: Aldis Hodge & Noah Wyle
| 33 | 4 | "The Hustler Job" | Marshall Tyler | Kate Rodick | April 24, 2025 |
The crew takes on a phone scamming ring that uses deepfake technology to con their marks, run by an old school hustler who came up via the pool hall circuit. To infiltrate his organization, they have to best him on and off the felt. Special guest stars: Noah Wyle
| 34 | 5 | "The Grand Complication Job" | Dean Devlin | Jamey Perry | May 1, 2025 |
When Sophie is abducted, rivals Parker and Astrid are forced into a desperate race against time to save her by securing the elusive “Grand Complication” Marie Antoinette watch. Unaware of each other’s involvement, they embark on a high stakes quest to track her down before time runs out. Special guest stars: Lucy Taylor, Alexandra Park & Jeri Ryan
| 35 | 6 | "The Swipe Right Job" | Erica Watson | Maya Vyas | May 8, 2025 |
Sophie’s return to dating goes awry when she discovers her newest flame is a phony billionaire, swindling men and women on dating apps to fund his lavish lifestyle. To dismantle his million dollar scheme, the team must create the perfect romantic specimen and bait the ultimate catfish. Special guest stars: Noah Wyle, Maulik Pancholy, Auden Wyle & Annet Mahendru
| 36 | 7 | "The Shakedown In Clone-Town Job" | Beth Riesgraf | Josh Schaer | May 15, 2025 |
Sophie, Eliot, and Parker get caught in a small-town speed trap run by a corrupt mayor, and decide to help the oppressed townspeople wrest power from his hungry clutches. Special guest stars: John Charles Meyer, Craig Frank, Julie Ivey & Cedric Yarbrough
| 37 | 8 | "The Cooling Off The Mark Job" | Marc Roskin | Alayna Heim | May 22, 2025 |
Old friend Hurley stumbles into the path of a mark out for vengeance on the crew. He must take point on one of the most delicate parts of the con — the Cool Off. Despite the crew’s help, the situation spins out of control into a brand new con, with a brand new victim. Special guest stars: Noah Wyle, Drew Powell
| 38 | 9 | "The Polygeist Job" | Doug Aarniokoski | Andrea Janakas | May 29, 2025 |
The crew pull a “Cabin in the Woods” con to take down a corrupt tech guru claiming to better the world using “effective altruism.” They target his company’s close-knit group of executives by turning their paranoia against them, but things get complicated when the group turns out to be much closer than they anticipated.
| 39 | 10 | "The Side Job" | Marc Roskin | John Rogers | June 5, 2025 |
Parker decides to take down a local factory kingpin who uses child labor. While the villain spins his own version of how he was wrongfully destroyed, the team tries to unravel the con Parker’s running as a solo side job. The team must play catch-up as they find themselves drafted into her machinations. Special guest stars: Aldis Hodge & Noah Wyle

== Production ==
=== Development ===
On April 22, 2020, IMDb TV announced that a 13-episode revival of the series had been ordered to be broadcast on its streaming service, the now-called Amazon Freevee. Dean Devlin, who served as executive producer on the original series, returned as executive producer for the revival alongside original series creators John Rogers and Chris Downey, who served as consulting producers and writers. Marc Roskin, Rachel Olschan-Wilson, and Kate Rorick are executive producers. Plans included Noah Wyle directing two episodes of the series and Beth Riesgraf also directing one, although Wyle wound up directing three and Beth Riesgraf two. Filming began August 10, 2020 in New Orleans and had wrapped as of March 2021. On April 5, 2021, Bellman tweeted that 16 episodes had been produced, up from the original 13. On December 9, 2021, IMDb TV renewed the series for a second season. On December 5, 2023, the series was renewed for a third season and moved to Amazon Prime Video. In December 2025 the series was cancelled after three seasons.

=== Casting ===
On April 22, 2020, IMDb announced that four of the original cast members would be returning with Beth Riesgraf, Gina Bellman, and Christian Kane in main roles and Aldis Hodge with a recurring role. Noah Wyle was announced as a new character; the only original cast member not returning for the revival would be Timothy Hutton, following rape allegations. In August 2020, it was announced that Aleyse Shannon was joining the cast as a series regular appearing as Breanna Casey, a hacker who grew up with the same foster mother as Hardison. In March 2021, it was announced James Marsters would be guest starring in the series.

== Release ==
The first season was released in two parts, with the first eight episodes of the series premiering on IMDb TV on July 9, 2021, and the remaining eight episodes released on October 8, 2021. In Canada, the series airs on CTV Drama Channel.

== Reception ==
Leverage: Redemption Season 1 holds a 93% percent rating on Rotten Tomatoes, based on 15 reviews. The critics' consensus for the first season reads: “An exciting new chapter in a beloved series, Leverage: Redemption captures the fun of the original run while giving its characters room to grow.” As of December 25, 2022, Rotten Tomatoes has gathered one review for the second season, a rave from Nina Metz of the Chicago Tribune, who observes: “The show is built around a delicious premise: Heists with a wink — and a heart. Has someone been wronged by a rich person who is plundering and destroying people’s lives in order to pad out their net worth? Then the Leverage team will swoop in with an elaborate caper while cracking wise. The goal? Karmic justice. The schemes are implausible but that’s embedded in the show’s lighthearted approach.”

== Lawsuit ==
In February 2022, Timothy Hutton, who played Nathan "Nate" Ford in the original Leverage series, sued producer Electric Entertainment for breach of contract, claiming he was unfairly omitted from participating in the revival of the drama series after he was accused of a 1983 sexual assault in Canada, a claim that was eventually dismissed by prosecutors. This in turn led to a countersuit by the producers, who accused him of purposely withholding an attempt to settle with a victim in order to try and stop a story about the accusations from leaking out near the time of contract negotiations, which would surely have stopped him from being offered a role due to it being a violation of the morals clause in his contract; the producers alleged that the allegations surfaced two weeks after principal term negotiations with Hutton had been completed, while Hutton disputed the idea that the clause existed.

In December 2024, it was announced both Hutton and Electric Entertainment had reached a settlement, the details of which were not disclosed.
