= Chris Downey =

American writer and producer

- Born: Queens, New York, United States
- Occupations: Writer, Producer
- Years active: 1998–present
- Spouse: Lisa DeLuca
- Children: Nicholas, Isabella

Chris Downey is a former journalist, "recovering" lawyer, and a television writer and producer. He is a former criminal defense attorney in New York and a reporter covering crime and government for a newspaper on the Gulf Coast of Florida. In television, Downey began his career in half-hour comedies, including Lateline, What About Joan and six seasons on The King of Queens. Downey transitioned into one hour drama when he co-created (with John Rogers) the caper series Leverage for TNT. Downey has been an Executive or Co-Executive Producer on TNT's King & Maxwell, USA's Suits, the Suits spinoff Pearson, Unsolved: The Murders of Tupac and The Notorious B.I.G, ABC's Station 19, Netflix's The Lincoln Lawyer, Peacock's Poker Face, and Amazon Prime's Bosch: Legacy. Downey has also branched in to science fiction writing for Fox's Almost Human and SyFy's Incorporated.

== Early life ==
Chris Downey was born and raised in Queens, New York. From a young age, Downey developed his passion for writing and storytelling through his love of Marvel comics. Before pursuing a career in television, Downey wrote for the University of Pennsylvania daily newspaper and went to Fordham law school. In his free time, Downey enjoys hikes, PB & Js, long form New Yorker articles, and collecting souvenirs from the 1939 New York World Fair.

== Career ==
=== Television ===
Downey was a co-creator, writer and an executive producer of the TV show, Leverage, which ran for five seasons from 2008–2012 on TNT. Nearly a decade later, the show was revived as Leverage: Redemption on Amazon Freevee and Amazon Prime Video and ran from 2021-2025. Downey stated that he feels the biggest challenge with the show is constantly having to come up with new challenges and cons for the crew, as he felt they had done so many already.

Year	Title
1998	Cosby
1999	Oh, Grow Up
2000	What About Joan
2001–2007	The King of Queens
2008–2012	Leverage
2013	King & Maxwell
2014–2016	Suits
2016–2017	Incorporated
2018	Unsolved
2019	Pearson
2020	Station 19
2021-2025	Leverage: Redemption
2022	The Lincoln Lawyer
2023	Poker Face
2023	Bosch: Legacy
2024	Bad Monkey

=== Podcast ===
For five months, between November 2012 and March 2013, Downey produced and hosted a weekly podcast, The Downey Files, at his personal website and on iTunes. Each episode featured Downey and a guest tackling a half-baked movie idea and developing it in full within a half-hour. Guests have included Wil Wheaton, John Rogers, Christine Boylan, Eric Heissner, Michael Colton, and John Aboud.
