= Unincorporated =

Unincorporated may refer to:

- Unincorporated area, land not governed by a local municipality
- Unincorporated entity, a type of organization
- Unincorporated territories of the United States, territories under U.S. jurisdiction, to which Congress has determined that only select parts of the U.S. Constitution apply
- Unincorporated association, also known as voluntary association, groups organized to accomplish a purpose
- Unincorporated (album), a 2001 album by Earl Harvin Trio
