= Just Married =

2003 film by Shawn Levy

- Theatrical release poster
- Directed by: Shawn Levy
- Written by: Sam Harper
- Produced by: Robert Simonds; Lauren Shuler Donner
- Starring: Ashton Kutcher; Brittany Murphy; Christian Kane
- Cinematography: Jonathan Brown
- Edited by: Scott Hill; Don Zimmerman
- Music by: Christophe Beck
- Production companies: Mediastream III; Robert Simonds Productions
- Distributed by: 20th Century Fox
- Release date: January 10, 2003
- Running time: 95 minutes
- Countries: United States; Germany
- Language: English
- Budget: $18 million
- Box office: $101.6 million

Just Married is a 2003 romantic comedy film directed by Shawn Levy, written by Sam Harper, and stars Ashton Kutcher and Brittany Murphy as a young newlywed couple from different social classes who take their honeymoon to Europe, where obstacles challenge their ability to sustain in marriage. Released by 20th Century Fox on January 10, 2003, the film was successful at the box office despite being critically panned.

== Plot ==
The film opens with Tom and Sarah in the airport, then flashes back from the moment they met up to the present.

Working-class Tom Leezak and upper-class Sarah McNerney meet up when Tom accidentally hits Sarah with a football on the beach. A few months later, despite opposition from Sarah's rich family, they get married. Each has kept one secret from the other: Tom doesn't tell her that he accidentally killed her dog and Sarah doesn't tell him that she slept with Peter Prentiss, a childhood family friend, after they started dating.

Flying to Europe for their honeymoon, they attempt to consummate their marriage by joining the mile high club, but fail rather publicly. Arriving at their classy hotel at the foot of the Alps they find that Peter has sent them a bottle of cognac "with love", while Tom's friend Kyle has sent them a Thunderstick A-200 sex toy.

When Tom tries to force the toy's American plug into the European outlet, he shuts down the entire village's electricity. The newlyweds leave the hotel after Tom has a heated argument with the hotel owner and pays a large bill to repair the power. While trying to find another hotel they crash their mini car into a snowbank, stuck until daylight and once again unable to consummate their marriage.

They make their way to Venice, staying at a pensione recommended by Tom's father. It turns out to be a wreck, and they soon check out after a cockroach crawls over Tom when they try to have sex.

The couple secure a luxurious Venetian hotel with the grudging financial help of Sarah's father. They go sightseeing, but Tom quickly gets bored and abandons her to watch sports in a bar. Sarah runs into Peter, who is staying at their hotel on business. This prompts her to initiate a conversation with Tom in which they reveal their secrets about her dog's death and Peter. They each storm out of the hotel and go their separate ways: he going back to the bar, where he meets American tourist Wendy, and she going sightseeing, where Peter follows her.

Wendy flirts and dances with Tom, who escapes through a bathroom window when he realizes she wants to have sex with him. He returns to the hotel, learning that Sarah has gone out with Peter for the evening. Accosted by Wendy, he finds himself tricked into walking her to his hotel room, where she rips off her top before Tom blurts out that he's on his honeymoon, upon which she finally leaves.

Sarah gets drunk so Peter takes her back to the hotel. When he kisses her at the entrance, she slaps him, reminding him that she's on her honeymoon. Tom sees the kiss from the balcony but not the slap. When he confronts her in their room, Sarah finds Wendy's bra. Peter bursts in to ask her to run away with him to Seattle, leading to a fight that lands Tom and Sarah in jail – still without consummating their marriage. Peter bails them out and the couple angrily decide to go home to Los Angeles, returning to the opening moments of the film.

Sarah has moved out and Tom wants to get back with her. Receiving advice from his father, he attempts to see her at her family's estate, but is unsuccessful trying to ram the gate. Tom decides to give a truthful explanation to Sarah's family about his uncertainty of his and Sarah's marriage and future. However he declares his love for Sarah and makes it clear he will continue to love her for the rest his entire life. Having heard his romantic speech, Sarah opens the gate and tells her father she loves Tom and he encourages her to get back with him. As Tom is running, Sarah manages to open the door and Tom catches her just in time. They apologise to each other and tearfully declare their love for one another. Sarah's family watch them as they forgive each other and begin to accept their relationship. Tom and Sarah agree to give their relationship another go and seal it with a passionate kiss.

== Cast ==
- Ashton Kutcher as Tom Leezak
- Brittany Murphy as Sarah McNerney
- Christian Kane as Peter Prentiss
- Monet Mazur as Lauren
- Raymond J. Barry as Mr. Leezak
- George Gaynes as Father Robert
- David Moscow as Kyle
- David Rasche as Mr. McNerney
- Valeria Andrews as Wendy
- Veronica Cartwright as Mrs. McNerney / Pussy
- Thad Luckinbill as Willie McNerney
- Taran Killam as Dickie McNerney
- Alex Thomas as Fred

== Reception ==
=== Box office ===
Just Married was successful at the box office. On a modest budget of $18 million, the film went on to gross $56,127,162 domestically and earned an additional $45,437,773 in foreign box office receipts, giving it a total worldwide gross of $101,564,935.

=== Critical response ===
Upon release, Just Married was panned by critics. On Rotten Tomatoes, it has a 20% approval rating based on 104 reviews, with an average rating of 3.9/10. The website's consensus states: "Just Married's plot is predictable, and the overdone pratfalls get tiresome." On Metacritic, the film has a score of 28 out of 100 based on reviews from 27 critics, indicating "generally unfavorable" reviews. Roger Ebert gave the film 1 1/2 stars out of 4, calling it a dumb sitcom.

=== Awards ===
The film earned three nominations at the 24th Golden Raspberry Awards including Worst Actor for Ashton Kutcher (also for Cheaper by the Dozen and My Boss's Daughter), Worst Supporting Actress for Brittany Murphy and Worst Screen Couple for both Kutcher and Murphy (also for My Boss's Daughter with Tara Reid), but failed to win in each of these categories, losing to Ben Affleck (Daredevil, Gigli and Paycheck), Demi Moore (Charlie's Angels: Full Throttle) and both Affleck and Jennifer Lopez (Gigli) respectively.
