= Leverage (American TV series) =

American action crime drama television series

- Genre: Action; Caper story; Thriller
- Created by: John Rogers; Chris Downey
- Starring: Timothy Hutton; Gina Bellman; Christian Kane; Beth Riesgraf; Aldis Hodge
- Composer: Joseph LoDuca
- Country of origin: United States
- Original language: English
- No. of seasons: 5
- No. of episodes: 77 (list of episodes)

Production
- Executive producers: Dean Devlin; John Rogers; Chris Downey; Marc Roskin
- Producer: Paul Bernard
- Production locations: Chicago (pilot); Los Angeles (season 1); Portland, OR as Boston (seasons 2–4); Portland, OR as Portland, OR (season 5)
- Cinematography: David Connell
- Editors: Sonny Baskin; David Siegel; Brian Gonosey
- Camera setup: Gary Camp
- Running time: 41–47 minutes
- Production companies: Electric Entertainment; Johnworld, Inc.; Leverage 4 Holdings; TNT Original Production

Original release
- Network: TNT
- Release: December 7, 2008 – December 25, 2012

Related
- Leverage: Redemption

Leverage is an American action crime drama television series, which aired on TNT from December 7, 2008, to December 25, 2012. The series was produced by Electric Entertainment, a production company of executive producer and director Dean Devlin. Leverage follows a five-person team: a thief, a grifter, a hacker, and a retrieval specialist or "hitter", led by former insurance investigator Nathan Ford, who use their skills to carry out heists to fight corporate and governmental injustices inflicted on ordinary citizens.

Season 1 consists of 13 episodes, which writers John Rogers and Chris Downey and producer Dean Devlin intended to be a complete story should the series not be renewed. Season 2, for which production moved from Los Angeles to Portland, Oregon, ran in two parts: a nine-episode summer season that premiered on July 15, 2009, followed by a further six episodes the following winter. Leverage moved to Sunday for season 3, which began on June 20, 2010.

Leverage was renewed for a fourth season on July 30, 2010. It premiered on June 26, 2011, and ran for 18 episodes, 10 in the summer and eight in the winter. The continuation of season 4 began on Sunday, November 27, 2011, at 9 pm EST on TNT.

On August 12, 2011, Leverage was renewed for a fifth season, to be both filmed and set in Portland. Season 5 premiered July 15, 2012. Leverage was canceled on December 21, 2012, amid falling ratings. The final episode, which was produced as a possible series finale, aired on December 25, 2012. On January 9, 2013, Leverage won Favorite Cable TV Drama at the 39th People's Choice Awards.

A 16-episode revival titled Leverage: Redemption began shooting in early August 2020 in New Orleans, Louisiana, with most cast members returning. It was released on IMDb TV in July 2021 with a second season airing in 2022–23, and a third season premiered on April 17, 2025.

== Series overview ==
Season	Episodes	Originally released	
Season	Episodes	First released	Last released
1	13	December 7, 2008	February 24, 2009
2	15	July 15, 2009	February 17, 2010
3	16	June 20, 2010	December 19, 2010
4	18	June 26, 2011	January 15, 2012
5	15	July 15, 2012	December 25, 2012

== Plot ==
Opening: (Narrated by Timothy Hutton)

"The rich and powerful, they take what they want. We steal it back for you. And sometimes, bad guys make the best good guys. We provide... leverage."

Nathan "Nate" Ford is a former insurance investigator known for recovering millions of dollars in stolen property and chasing the most dangerous and elusive thieves in the world. Nate's son, who was ill, died after IYS, the insurance company he'd spent his career working for, used questionable ethics to deny coverage of a treatment necessary to save the child's life. Emotionally and financially devastated due to the expensive treatment and eventual loss of his son and marriage, Nate is approached by aerospace industrialist Victor Dubenich to recover intellectual property stolen by leading a group of thieves, all of whom Nate has previously chased. Nate initially disagrees, as the thieves all have reputations for being loners who do not cooperate with others; they include hacker Alec Hardison, 'hitter' Eliot Spencer, and a thief known only as "Parker". Dubenich eventually convinces Nate to change his mind. While the job is successful, Dubenich double-crosses them and attempts to have them killed. Instead of fleeing, Nate persuades the team to retaliate, and further recruits the assistance of Sophie Deveraux, a formidable grifter and aspiring actress who is a long-time acquaintance of Nate's, to put Dubenich out of business. Under Nate's leadership, the group coalesces into a very effective unit, succeeding in ruining Dubenich's business, clearing their names, and providing each thief with enough money to retire from crime. Realizing their potential as a team, they approach Nate to continue under his leadership. Forced to choose between being a "white knight" and the "black king," Nate accepts on one condition: they will only target the corrupt and powerful to avenge ordinary people who have no other recourse, ergo "providing leverage".

During Season 1, the team initially struggles in adjusting to Nate's leadership and his attempts to reform them. Subplots include Nate's struggle with alcoholism, his complicated relationship with Sophie, and the budding romance between Hardison and Parker. Eliot's past in the military is also a recurring theme, involving kindred soldiers who have returned from war, old enemies from his missions encountered during their jobs, and a case set in his hometown. Season 1 also establishes several running gags, including Eliot's numerous hidden talents, Hardison and Parker receiving cover IDs as FBI agents in organized crime, and Sophie's inability to act unless she's breaking the law. The team operates with impunity as "Leverage Consulting & Associates" out of Los Angeles until the season finale, in which Nate's former colleague, James Sterling, begins pursuing them on behalf of IYS. In response, they steal a collection of valuable art from Nate's former boss, Ian Blackpoole, returning it in exchange for Blackpoole being fired from his own company, and the team disbands for six months.

Season 2 begins in Boston, Nate's hometown. The team reunites and resumes their activities, now operating out of Nate's apartment and a local bar. Nate struggles with his recent sobriety while Sophie goes on a journey of self-discovery following an attempt on her life. While she is away, she sends her friend and fellow grifter, Tara Cole, to assist the team and keep tabs on Nate. After assisting Sterling on a job that gets him invited to join Interpol, the team soon run afoul of him when they stumble onto one of his cases. In exchange for letting the team go free, Nate surrenders to his former friend, admitting to Sterling and himself that he is now a thief.

As Season 3 begins, Nate is in a Supermax prison and the team attempts to free him, until a mysterious Italian woman blackmails them into taking down the untouchable criminal Damien Moreau in exchange for the expungement of Nate's criminal record. The team spends several jobs targeting known associates of Moreau in an effort to get closer to him before learning that Eliot worked for him as an assassin. At season's end, Moreau is imprisoned in San Lorenzo, a fictional nation formerly under his control.

Season 4 opens days after the team's return from San Lorenzo, when they discover that someone has been bugging their headquarters. The culprit is later identified as the wealthy businessman Jack Latimer, who has been profiting off their victories and now offers information on the evildoings of other major corporations, in exchange for profit on each company's downfall. Nate refuses the offer, and his father is killed. Nate deduces that Latimer is working with Victor Dubenich (the team's first victim) to anticipate their movements, and the team must use proxies in the season finale to take them both down.

Season 5 opens with Nate having moved the team to Portland and setting up shop in a microbrewery (Bridgeport Brew Pub), but the season premiere ends with the revelation that Nate is working with Hardison on a secret project unknown to the others. After a series of extremely intricate confidence tricks, the secret project is revealed and carried out, despite the recurrent Sterling. The series finale, broadcast on Christmas Day 2012, also reveals drastic changes in the lives and dynamics of the team, but assures the audience of their continuity.

=== Setup ===
Most episodes follow a set story structure: After meeting the client, the Leverage team researches the villains to find a weakness to exploit. Each con, either as originally planned or as complications develop, typically requires the specialized skills of all the members of the group. Towards the end of each episode, the villains seem to get the upper hand, only to be outwitted by the team. Because most of the narrative has seemed to follow the team's point of view, the audience is momentarily uninformed as to exactly how they have succeeded in their con. A flashback then reveals how a seeming complication was either anticipated by the Leverage team, or used in a clever improvisation. These flashbacks, which are featured in most episodes, sometimes reveal only in retrospect that an earlier scene was actually a clue to the Leverage team's plan. More often, the flashbacks reveal new information to which the viewer has not been privy. This formula is followed by every episode in seasons one, two, and three. With the exception of the final season, each season ends with a two-part finale which involves a two-part, multi-stage con designed to bring down a major adversary, such as an international crime financier in season three, with an ending that advances the team's story into the new season.

== Cast and characters ==
=== Main cast ===
- Timothy Hutton as Nathan "Nate" Ford, called "The Mastermind" or, in the opening credits of later seasons, "The Brain": A former insurance fraud investigator for IYS Insurance, operated by Ian Blackpoole, and the team's mastermind. The son of South Boston numbers runner Jimmy Ford, Nate originally intended to become a Catholic priest prior to becoming an insurance investigator. While Ford was working for IYS, Blackpoole implemented a policy of denying all claims and forcing a lengthy appeals process before anyone can get paid. (Blackpoole claimed the policy was implemented to cut costs, but in fact, it was so that his company would be able to turn a bigger profit.) When Nate's young son Sam became terminally ill, IYS refused to pay for a potentially life-saving procedure, claiming it was experimental, resulting in his death. The aftermath led to Nate's divorce from his wife Maggie, his subsequent dismissal from the company, and his descent into alcoholism. At this low point, Nate was hired to lead a group of thieves to retrieve stolen documents. After meeting the team for the first time and running a con against their employer, who double-crossed them, Nate is asked to continue working with them and is given the privilege of leading the team and selecting what clients the team will help. A skilled planner and chess player, Nate draws on his experience as an insurance investigator to anticipate the moves of his team's marks. Nate is affable, but is unwilling to discuss his own problems with friends or others. His tendency to change objectives in the middle of a job, his alcoholism, and his often-tenuous relationship with his team has, on occasion, put the client and the team at risk. Nate's struggle to battle his demons is a major theme of the series, and it is not till the series finale that he is finally able to walk away and find peace.
- Gina Bellman as Sophie Devereaux, "The Grifter": An accomplished British grifter with a taste for art theft and a desire to become a legitimate actress. Multi-lingual and particularly adept at the use of accents, Sophie is seen to portray many characters in various cons, usually making direct contact with marks to draw them into the con. Comically, her attempts to make a career as an actress lead to nothing but failure, as she proves woefully untalented and over-the-top onstage. Only during a con, when she can disappear effortlessly into a character, can she actually act well, ironically, if she is pretending to be an actress. (As Nate phrases it, "She can act...when it's an act.") Sophie has a collection of aliases, which includes "Sophie Devereaux", and her real name is unknown. She has a long history with Nate, dating back at least 10 years to a period when he investigated her spree of art theft for IYS. At some point, they recognized an attraction to one another (possibly around the time they shot each other) and their relationship wavers between platonic and romantic for much of the show's run, leaving Sophie alternately frustrated, angry, and disappointed. Sophie often acts as second in command to Nate and will take charge when Nate is out of control. Sophie and Nate have on occasion tried to further the relationship, but for various reasons, one or the other resisted until they wound up in bed together in the third-season finale. After that, they settle into an occasionally bumpy, but devoted, romance. Nate proposes to Sophie in the series finale (using what he believes to be her real name), and they depart the team for parts unknown.
- Aldis Hodge as Alec Hardison, "The Hacker": The team's computer specialist, gadgeteer and hacker. He is a self-proclaimed geek and science fiction fan, with an easygoing manner and a dry, unusual wit. Hardison was raised by a foster parent, an older woman he refers to as "Nana", and his first large-scale crimes involved sticking the country of Iceland with Nana's medical bills. Hardison can hack into most forms of electronics, and he is rarely caught. Hardison designed and assembled the computer and video systems in the team's headquarters, and is responsible for the two-way earpieces ("earbuds") used by the team on each episode. Hardison is a convincing actor, able to talk his way out of almost any scenario, but he is often too clever for his own good, and whenever he has the opportunity to lead a con, he devises overcomplicated schemes usually doomed to failure. He is also very attached to his electronics (and in particular his van, "Lucille") and shown to become very depressed when the con takes a turn for the worse and requires his electronics to be destroyed so the team can make its escape. Hardison from time to time will back up Eliot in fighting situations although his skills are not nearly as extensive. Hardison's and Parker's relationship develops into a romantic one as time goes on, but it is fraught with personal (and physical) complications.
- Christian Kane as Eliot Spencer, "The Hitter": The team's highly skilled martial artist, weapons expert, and self-described "retrieval specialist". A former black ops soldier, his role in cons is often to play supporting roles while protecting the team, often leading him into hand-to-hand combat that draws on his considerable fighting skills. Eliot was once a hitman for crime financier Damien Moreau, and he is well known as a legendary hired gun, assassin and bodyguard before he switched careers and went into business as a thief. Despite being a skilled marksman, Elliot has an intense dislike for firearms, and uses them only when no other options are available to him. While merely presumed as the muscleman, he demonstrates a subtle intelligence in conversation, often taking advantage of the underestimations of others and later in the series performing as a grifter along with Sophie. In contrast to the other characters, Eliot prefers to keep his romantic life private, as well as much of his background, which includes some very dark deeds of which he refuses to speak. Over the course of the series, he displays extraordinary talent for singing and cooking, and later takes charge of the kitchen of the microbrewery in Portland where the team has set up headquarters, despite clashes with Hardison on the subject of food.
- Beth Riesgraf as Parker, "The Thief": An expert thief, cat-burglar, pickpocket and safe-cracker, memorably referred to (by Eliot) as "20 pounds of crazy in a five-pound bag". The product of an abusive childhood spent in several foster homes, Parker is awkward around other people and has a terrible understanding of social norms. Over the course of the series, she comes to regard the other members of the team as her family, and for the first time in her life, trusts someone other than herself. Sophie and other members of the team have attempted to improve gaps in her social skills on numerous occasions, usually with limited success. As they become closer, Parker develops romantic feelings for Hardison, but her inability to properly express her feelings leads to a slow, awkward courtship. While emotionally impulsive, she can demonstrate great physical self-control in her work using acrobatics, strength, and concentration to her advantage. Parker was trained at a young age by expert thief (and recurring character) Archie Leach (Richard Chamberlain), and her obsessive focus on theft is to the point that her safe house is filled with gear and rappelling equipment to help her in various jobs. Parker is often sensitive to cons involving children, and at several points, the team's other members were thrown into danger when she went off-script to ensure an at-risk child did not end up like her. In season 5's "The Broken Wing Job", she proves that she can handle problems on her own while the other team members are away and seems to be, with Nate's guidance, developing her ability as a planner. In the series finale, Nate retires and leaves the team in her hands as the new Mastermind.

=== Recurring cast ===
- Mark Sheppard as James Sterling, Nate's colleague and rival at IYS, and later an Interpol agent. Sterling learns of Nate's new life and begins to follow him, first thinking that Nate wants his job at IYS and later to bring the team to justice. Nate soon realizes Sterling is on his trail, but foils his efforts to dismantle the team's cons. In time, a theft leads Sterling to work with the team on a con, the outcome of which leads to his being offered a position with Interpol. The two remain friendly adversaries, though the team's other members all hate him passionately (mostly Eliot), and Sterling has, on several occasions, allowed Nate to continue to remain untouched in exchange for Nate and his group helping him catch bad guys—for which he takes full credit. In the episode "The Queen's Gambit Job", Sterling tricks the team into helping him rescue his daughter Olivia, whose existence was previously unknown even to Nate. As of season 5's "The Frame-Up Job", he has become the head of a special Interpol art theft/forgery detail which he himself had organized. In the series finale, he shows his ultimate respect for Nate and seemingly ends their rivalry by allowing Nate to escape from an Interpol office with a hard drive full of information.
- Jeri Ryan as Tara Cole, a self-assured grifter who was sent by Sophie to replace her while Sophie leaves on a quest to "find herself". An ex-agent who formerly attended Quantico, Tara shows a talent for cryptography, hand-to-hand combat, interrogation, and evasion. (In reality, Ryan's involvement was due to Gina Bellman's pregnancy.) Tara is able to adapt to the team's method, but she struggles to be accepted by the team. It is only when she learns to loathe Sterling that Eliot tells her NOW she is part of the team. Tara is completely honest about being a con-for-profit (seeking a cut from most of their jobs), but soon she learns to understand their not-for-profit motives. Tara returns in Season 4 to assist Parker and Sophie in the episode, "The Girls Night Out Job."
- Kari Matchett as Maggie Collins, Nate's ex-wife, an art expert who re-enters his life while working with IYS Chair Ian Blackpoole. Maggie still cares for Nate, but she cannot stand his alcoholism and self-destructive tendencies, which led her to divorce him. She is initially unaware of IYS's role in her son's death, but learns the whole story as she is drawn into one of Nate's cons, which allows them to come to terms with his death and begin to rebuild their relationship. She demonstrates a flair for Nate's new work and ends up helping the team complete a con in the season 1 finale; later, the team comes to her rescue when she is falsely accused of theft. She returns to help the team in the fourth-season finale and by then has developed a close friendship with Sophie, to Nate's surprise and unease.
- Rick Overton and Gerald Downey as FBI Special Agents Taggert and McSweeten, who have (unwittingly) worked with the team on at least four occasions, believing Hardison and Parker to be fellow FBI agents. Credited with major arrests following four of the team's cons, they have risen through the ranks of the bureau rapidly. McSweeten, who appears several times without Taggert's involvement, also has a crush on Parker (whom he thinks is "Agent Hagen"), which is a constant source of Hardison's jealousy. In season 5, McSweeten seeks the team's help with a case that obsesses his father.
- Robert Blanche as Detective Captain Patrick Bonanno, a Massachusetts State Police detective the team tips off when they want a mark to be arrested. An honest cop who has the team's respect, Bonanno is apparently aware of the team's work, but has never attempted to pursue them. At the end of season 2, he is nearly murdered by an arms dealer, and Nate arranges a con to avenge him. Bonanno is a lieutenant in season 2, but is promoted to captain as season 3 opens, and is a regular at Nate's weekly poker games in season 4.
- Tom Skerritt as Jimmy Ford, Nate's father, an Irish-American numbers-runner and grifter, and a legendary figure in the Boston crime circles. Nate's choice of career was in reaction to his troubled relationship with his father, and after disrupting one of Jimmy's cons, forced him into retirement in Ireland. He returned at the end of the fourth season and manages to mend his relationship with his son before being killed by Latimer and Dubenich.
- Richard Chamberlain as Archie Leach, an expert thief who was a professional mentor and father figure to Parker. He inadvertently involved the team in a job when Parker came to his aid. He began training Parker at the age of 12, and although he wished to adopt her, he was unable to do so since he was keeping his life of crime a secret from his wife and family; he also recognized that Parker would have trouble fitting in with his family. Leach returned to assist the team in the fourth-season finale, where he finally referred to Parker as his daughter and gave Parker's and Hardison's relationship his blessing.
- Goran Visnjic as Damien Moreau, an international crime financier and illegal-goods trader who has thus far been untouchable by international law enforcement. Moreau hides behind a network of people who do his bidding, while living on an isolated island. The team must use the clues and connections they find during their cases to take down his network and bring him to justice while under the watchful eye of a woman known only as "the Italian". Due to the machinations of the team, Moreau is eventually jailed in the small, politically unstable country of San Lorenzo.
- Elisabetta Canalis as "The Italian", an unnamed Italian woman who blackmails the team into taking down Moreau within six months. If the team fails, she promises to have Nate imprisoned and the rest of the team killed.
- Wil Wheaton as Colin "Chaos" Mason, an unscrupulous hacker whose skills rival Hardison's. Chaos and Hardison see each other as nemeses, but Chaos has also attempted to kill Sophie and nearly succeeded. Despite being arrested twice after going up against Leverage Consulting, he is reluctantly hired to assist the team in the fourth-season finale.
- Clayne Crawford as Quinn, a professional man of violence who is almost as good as Eliot. He opposes the team in the first-season finale, but bears Elliot no ill will, and is hired to assist them in the fourth-season finale.
- Leon Rippy as Jack Latimer, a multibillion-dollar professional investor who has been tracking the team since their first job. He profits from the team by way of betting against the companies the Leverage crew takes down, thus getting ahead of the market. He has twice attempted to make a deal with Nate; he would let them know of companies that have covered their tracks so well that they do not show on the team's radar, and when the team takes down said companies, he will make certain investments from which he will profit. As of "The Lonely Hearts Job", he appears to be working with someone who wants to make war on the team. In the fourth-season finale, he was last seen falling from the top of a dam, struggling for control over a gun with Victor Dubenich, and then a sound of a gunshot is heard.
- Saul Rubinek as Victor Dubenich, the mark in the pilot episode, who assembled the team for Nate and then double-crossed them, motivating them to unite to destroy his business and get him jailed. At the end of the fourth season, he is seen as being behind Latimer's involvement with the team as part of his plot (from prison) for revenge. He was also last seen falling from the top of a dam, struggling for control over a gun with Jack Latimer, and then a sound of a gunshot is heard.
- Adam Baldwin as Colonel Vance, a United States Army Special Operations officer given the task of counter-terrorism operations, and formerly Eliot's commanding officer. Between seasons 4 and 5, Eliot and he infiltrate a foreign missile site as seen in a flashback. Later, he works with Eliot, Hardison, and Parker to foil a terror attack on Washington, DC.

== Production ==
Executive producer and director Dean Devlin pitched Leverage to TNT in mid-2007. The show was greenlighted in October and the pilot, which was written by John Rogers and Chris Downey, was shot in July 2008. Devlin said of the show's creation: "I just wanted to do the type of show that I grew up with and loved. I missed Mission: Impossible and The Rockford Files. Television today tends to be more dry, dark and edgy. I’m not saying it’s bad, but it’s not the type of show I was interested in. So when TNT said they wanted to get a TV show out of me, I said I wanted to do a throwback type of show. I wanted to have fun. I don’t want to live in a dark world."

Thirteen episodes were commissioned for the first season. The show's pilot was filmed on-location in Chicago, with the remainder of the first season set and filmed in Los Angeles. For the second through fourth seasons, the show was primarily set in Boston, but filmed in Portland. Executive producer Dean Devlin announced the fifth season would not only be shot in Portland, but set there, as well.

Leverage was primarily shot using Red One for the first four seasons video cameras. For the fifth season Red Epic cameras,Extensive use of Steadicam helped the audience participate in the scene. All of the dailies were shipped on hard drives to Electric Entertainment in Hollywood, California. Shooting, editing, and all post-production work were done digitally, using no physical film or videotape at any point in the process. Leverage was originally edited in Apple's Final Cut Studio Pro 7, but has used Final Cut Pro X in the later seasons. Shooting was in 4096 x 2304 at 24 frame/s, though resolution was reduced in post-production to 1080p.

== Broadcast ==
The series premiered on December 7, 2008, on TNT in the United States. In the United Kingdom, the series aired on Bravo, where it premiered on January 20, 2010; when Bravo closed down, it was picked up by Fox. The series started broadcasting January 7, 2009, on W Channel in Australia.

=== Syndication ===
In 2012, Ion Television announced that reruns of Leverage would become part of their schedule. The series debuted on the network on July 1, 2012. The show is broadcast in marathons on Sundays.

As of Summer 2018, Ion broadcasts Leverage in four hour blocks in the mornings, Monday through Thursday.

2020: Episodes of "Leverage" are shown at 11am and 8pm Monday through Friday on AMGTV.

== Ratings ==
In Live + 7 data, Leverage averaged 4.0 million viewers per episode in the first season, 4.5 million viewers per episode in the second season, and 4.5 million viewers per episode in the third season.

=== First season ===
The series ranks as ad-supported cable's #1 entertainment program in the Tuesday 10 pm (ET/PT) time slot among viewers, households, and adults 25–54. The December 7, 2008, premiere was watched by 5.6 million viewers and scored TNT's best original series telecast ever in delivery of adults 18–49 during the regular broadcast season. Through its first nine episodes, Leverage averaged 3.2 million viewers and 1.4 million adults 18–49 in Live + Same Day viewing. The first six episodes scored strong growth when comparing Live to Live + 7 numbers, with total viewership rising 33% to 4.1 million and adults 18–49 rising 42% to 1.9 million.

=== Second season ===
Data from TNT indicates a large percentage of viewers recorded the second-season finale of Leverage for later viewing. The Live + 7 viewership of 4.2 million viewers was 70% greater than the Live data for the same episode. In addition, for the season, Live +7 viewership was 58% greater than Live viewership.

=== Third season ===
The premiere of Leverage on June 20, 2010, averaged about 3.0 million viewers for the two episodes, and maintained a 1.0 rating for Adults 18–49.

=== Fourth season ===
The June 26, 2011, premiere episode was viewed by 3.42 million viewers (10% more than the third-season premiere) while the January 15, 2012, season finale was viewed by 3.9 million viewers.

=== Fifth season ===
The fifth-season premiere episode was viewed by 3.39 million viewers, and achieved a 0.8 Adults 18–49 rating. The fifth-season finale, also the series finale, was watched by 3.04 million viewers and achieved a 0.7 rating in Adults 18–49.

== Reception ==
Critical reaction to Leverage has been generally positive, with review aggregation website Metacritic reporting "generally favorable reviews" by critics. Reviewing the show's first two episodes, Ken Tucker of Entertainment Weekly wrote that Leverage is "shrewdly conceived, and it moves along like a son of a gun". He felt that the "backup crew ... wisecrack without much charm", but also that "Hutton's top-grade work and the twisty plots" made up for this. Tucker concluded that the show was "better than the last two Ocean's Eleven movies". Robert Bianco of USA Today felt that Leverage "seems to owe more to other movies and shows than it does to real life", pointing specifically to The Sting and Mission: Impossible as obvious sources of inspiration, but concluded: "at least it's paying its debt in an entertaining fashion." Bianco felt that "Leverage does get overly busy at times (simpler camera work would help)", but also that Hutton "supplies the charisma the show needs to succeed and the weight to keep it grounded".

Reviewing the show's first season for the DVD review website DVD Talk, David Cornelius wrote: "The cast is terrific, bringing out the comedy without reaching for camp, while the scripts, if not exactly airtight, offer enough breezy fun. It's a bit slight, but it's also solid entertainment." Reviewing the second season for the same website, John Sinnott wrote: "Though this season is a bit of a let down after the first one, Leverage is still a very good show. This character driven program has some truly enjoyable characters and some great stories." Reviewing the third season, Sinnott wrote: "This third year's worth of episodes is a step up from season two, even if a couple of the shows are hit-and-miss. Happily, there are far more hits than misses." Reviewing the fourth season, Sinnott wrote: "A step up in quality from season three, the fourth season of Leverage is fun, energetic, and immensely entertaining. The first couple of episodes are a bit bland, but after those the show picks up the pace and fires on all cylinders."

Reviewing the season 5 premiere, David Hinckley of the New York Daily News felt it was "business as usual" for the show, but still "cool, fast-paced and thoroughly pleasant".

On a scale of one to 100, DVD review website DVD Verdict rated the five seasons of the show 98, 88, 84, 82, and 90, respectively.

== Home media ==
Paramount Home Entertainment released the first three seasons of Leverage on DVD in the United States (Region 1). The fourth and fifth seasons were released by 20th Century Fox. In Canada, Alliance Home Entertainment released the first three seasons on DVD.

In Region 2, Icon Home Entertainment released the first three seasons on DVD in the UK. Season 4 was released on November 18, 2013.

In Region 4, Visual Entertainment released all five seasons on DVD in Australia.

Season	Episodes	Originally aired		DVD release date		
Season	Episodes	Season premiere	Season finale	Region 1	Region 2	Region 4
1	13	December 7, 2008	February 24, 2009	July 14, 2009	September 6, 2010	August 10, 2009
2	15	July 15, 2009	February 17, 2010	May 25, 2010	January 31, 2011	March 7, 2011
3	16	June 20, 2010	December 19, 2010	June 7, 2011	May 28, 2012	December 9, 2011
4	18	June 26, 2011	January 15, 2012	July 17, 2012	November 18, 2013	June 18, 2012
5	15	July 15, 2012	December 25, 2012	September 17, 2013	August 15, 2014	March 26, 2013

== Related books ==
=== Tie-in novels ===
Shortly after the show's cancellation, tie-in novels were published by Berkley:

- The Con Job by Matt Forbeck (2012)
- The Zoo Job by Keith R.A. DeCandido (2013)
- The Bestseller Job by Greg Cox (2013)

=== Roleplaying game ===
Margaret Weis Productions released a role-playing game based on the show and using the Cortex Plus system in 2010, with pdf supplements coming out in 2012 and 2013. In the game, whether or not they play the actual characters on the show, the players are expected to take on one of the five roles within the Leverage team: Grifter, Hitter, Hacker, Mastermind, or Thief. Every character has a second role they can perform well, and two they cannot perform at all. In order to run cons as in the show, the player role-playing the Mastermind is given incomplete information with which to run the con, a twist is introduced midway (as in a three-act structure), and the players are given Plot Points that they can use to establish flashback scenes. The Leverage Roleplaying Game was nominated for an Origins award.

== Adaptation ==
A South Korean adaptation produced by Production H and Higround for TV Chosun aired October 13 to December 8, 2019. It is distributed by Sony Pictures Television.

== Revival ==
On April 22, 2020, IMDb announced that a 13-episode revival of the series had been ordered to air on its own streaming service, IMDb TV. The series debuted on July 9, 2021, with an order of 16 episodes. Noah Wyle headlines the series as a new character with original cast members Beth Riesgraf, Gina Bellman, Christian Kane and Aldis Hodge reprising their roles. Timothy Hutton did not return for the revival. Dean Devlin, who served as executive producer on the original series, returned again as executive producer for the revival alongside original series creators John Rogers and Chris Downey who served as consulting producers.

The revival, entitled Leverage: Redemption, began shooting in August 2020 in New Orleans. Parker and Eliot both return, as does Sophie, who also becomes the team's new mastermind after Nate passes away a year before the events of the revival. Two new team members join as part of the main cast: Hardison's foster sister Breanna Casey (Aleyse Shannon), herself an engineer and hacker, and Harry Wilson (Wyle), formerly a lawyer for the kind of people that the team targets. Aldis Hodge returns as Hardison in spots, but his appearances were limited because of his shooting schedule for City on a Hill, Black Adam and Cross.
