= John Rogers (writer) =

American screenwriter

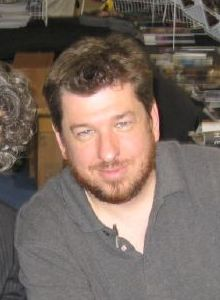
- Born: Worcester, Massachusetts, U.S.
- Education: McGill University
- Occupation: Writer
- Years active: 1996–present
- Notable work: Jackie Chan Adventures; Leverage; The Librarians; Transformers; Marry Me
- Website: kfmonkey.blogspot.com

John Rogers is an American screenwriter. He is known as the creator of the television series Jackie Chan Adventures (2000–2005), Leverage (2008–2012; 2021–present as Leverage: Redemption on Freevee), The Librarians (2014–2018), and The Player (2015).

Rogers co-wrote the films American Outlaws (2001), The Core (2003), Catwoman (2004), and Marry Me (2022), and co-wrote the story for the film Transformers (2007).

== Early life and education ==
Rogers was born in Worcester, Massachusetts, and attended McGill University in Montreal, Quebec. While at McGill, he wrote for the school's comedy magazine The Red Herring.

== Career ==
Rogers wrote the first draft of the script for the live-action movie Transformers, released in 2007. He wrote an early screenplay for Catwoman and created the cartoon series Jackie Chan Adventures. He also co-wrote the science fiction adventure film The Core. In 2004 Rogers wrote and executive-produced a television pilot based on the graphic novel Global Frequency. Although the pilot was never aired on network television, it was leaked onto the internet and accrued an international fan base. He created and served as executive producer for the TNT television series Leverage, which ran for five seasons from 2008 to 2012.

In addition to his work in television and film, Rogers has also written for the comic book industry. In March 2006, he launched an ongoing DC Comics series starring the new Blue Beetle, Jaime Reyes, with co-plotter Keith Giffen and artist Cully Hamner. Rogers stayed on the series for two years, until #25. Some of his earlier comics work was created for Boom! Studios, where he penned a number of short stories for genre-themed anthologies Zombie Tales (and its sequels Zombie Tales: Oblivion and Zombie Tales: The Dead), Cthulhu Tales, Pirate Tales, Ninja Tales as well as What Were They Thinking?!, a series where contemporary writers wrote new humorous plots and dialogue over old stories. Rogers' last comics work to date is a fifteen-issue Dungeons & Dragons series for IDW Publishing.

Rogers has also worked on role-playing games, and is the author of Feywild chapter of the 4th edition Dungeons & Dragons, Manual of the Planes (2008).

== Filmography ==
Film

- American Outlaws (2001)
- The Core (2003)
- Catwoman (2004)
- Transformers (2007) (Story only)
- Marry Me (2022)

Television

Year	Title	Director	Writer	Executive producer	Creator	Notes
1996–1999	Cosby		Yes			7 episodes; Also executive story editor, producer and co-producer
2000–2005	Jackie Chan Adventures		Yes		Developer	Episode "The Dark Hand"
2002	Red Skies		Yes	Yes		TV movie
2005	Global Frequency		Yes	Yes	Yes	Unaired pilot
2006	Eureka		Yes			Episode "Before I Forget" (Teleplay)
2008–2012	Leverage	Yes	Yes	Yes	Yes	Directed 4 episodes; Wrote 16 episodes
2014–2018	The Librarians		Yes	Yes	Developer	7 episodes
2015	The Player		Yes	Yes	Yes	Episode "Pilot"
2020–2021	MacGyver			Yes		
