= Nancy Temple =

American attorney

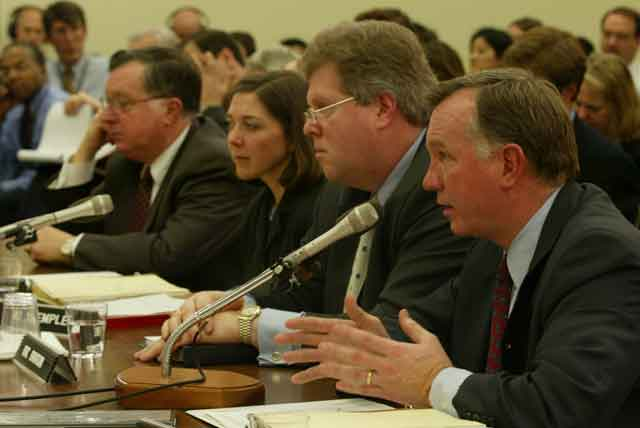
Nancy Temple, second from the left, testifies with other Arthur Andersen witnesses on January 24, 2002.

Nancy Anne Temple is an attorney specializing in accounting liability. She was the in-house attorney for Arthur Andersen, who advised Michael Odom and David B. Duncan about Arthur Andersen policies regarding retention of documents from client engagements. Duncan oversaw the shredding of Arthur Andersen documents concerning their work for client Enron, between October 22 and November 9, 2001 (See the Timeline of the Enron scandal). A memo written by Temple played a key role in the conviction of Arthur Andersen on charges of obstruction of justice. That conviction was later overturned.

== Pre-Andersen ==
She graduated from the University of Illinois College of Business in 1986 with a Bachelor of Science in Accountancy. After graduation, Temple attended Harvard Law School where she graduated with a Juris Doctor in 1989. She began her career at Sidley Austin Brown & Wood, now known as Sidley Austin. She worked at the law firm for 11 years and was inducted as a partner. Temple specialized in accounting liability.

== Arthur Andersen conviction overturned ==
On May 31, 2005, the United States Supreme Court overturned the conviction of Arthur Andersen in a unanimous decision.

Chief Justice William H. Rehnquist, writing for the court, said the former Big Five accounting firm's obstruction-of-justice conviction was improper because the instructions at trial were too vague for jurors to determine correctly whether Andersen obstructed justice. "'[T]he jury instructions at issue simply failed to convey the requisite consciousness of wrongdoing," he wrote. "[I]t is striking how little culpability the instructions required."

In post-conviction interviews, several of the Arthur Andersen jurors indicated that the "guilty" verdict was partly based on an internal October 16, 2001 email from in-house Arthur Andersen attorney Nancy Temple. The text of the email from Temple is as follows:

To: David B. Duncan
Cc: Michael C. Odom@ANDERSEN WO: Richard Corgci@ANDERSEN WO

BCC:
Date: 10/16/2001 08:39 PM
From: Nancy A. Temple
Subject: Re: Press Release draft
Attachments: ATT&ICIQ; 3rd qtr press release memo.doc

Dave - Here are a few suggested comments for consideration.

- I recommended deleting reference to consultation with legal group and deleting my name on the memo. Reference to the legal group consultation arguably is a waiver of attorney-client privileged advice and if my name is mentioned it increases the chances that I might be a witness, which I prefer to avoid.
- I suggested deleting some language that might suggest we concluded the release is misleading.
- In light of the "non-recurring" characterization, the lack of any suggestion that this characterization is not in accordance with GAAP, and the lack of income statements in accordance with GAAP. I will consult further within the legal group as to whether we should do anything more to protect ourselves from potential Section 10A issues.

Nancy

The Supreme Court's unanimous reversal of the conviction reinforces the opinion that the jury should not have inferred any liability on Arthur Andersen based solely upon the October 16 memo. Rather, Temple's bar license required that she not do anything that would waive the "attorney-client" privilege of Enron or Arthur Andersen. By having her name and a legal reference removed, in effect she was making the subject memo suitable for public disclosure – it was no longer a "privileged" document.

In addition, public accounting firms had a duty to notify the SEC within a defined time window if the accountants disagreed with a public accounting filing by a client. Temple's memo notes that the subject matter at issue was determined not to be of a nature that would require that Arthur Andersen to notify the SEC - i.e., a "Section 10A" filing, and her memo indicates that she will consult with the lawyers – again – to verify that conclusion.

== Post-Andersen ==
Nancy Temple is married and has three sons. After the Arthur Andersen case, Ms. Temple began working for Freeman, Freeman & Salzman P.C. law firm, now defunct. On April 1, 2008, Temple returned to practice law at Katten & Temple LLP, a firm she co-founded that specializes in litigation.
