= Anatomy of Greed =

2002 book

Anatomy of Greed: The Unshredded Truth from an Enron Insider
- Author: Brian Cruver
- Publication date: July 2002
- Pages: 366
- ISBN: 978-0-786-71093-5

Anatomy of Greed: The Unshredded Truth from an Enron Insider is a 2002 book by Brian Cruver, a former Enron employee, detailing the Enron scandal. The book is written as a first-hand account of the Enron story, covering his personal experiences working at the company as well as the experiences of several unnamed associates. Released by Avalon Publishing in the United States and by Random House in Europe, it was the first major non-fiction work written about the Enron scandal.

In 2003, CBS aired a television movie based on Cruver's book entitled The Crooked E: The Unshredded Truth About Enron starring Brian Dennehy, Christian Kane and Mike Farrell, directed by Penelope Spheeris, which was a ratings hit for the network.

== See also ==
- Accounting scandals
- Arthur Andersen
