= Joseph Berardino =

American accountant

Joseph (Joe) F. Berardino
- Education: Fairfield, B.S.
- Years active: 2008-Present
- Employer: Alvarez and Marsal
- Title: Managing Director

Joseph (Joe) F. Berardino (born 1950) is an American businessman, Certified Public Accountant, and managing director at Alvarez and Marsal. Beradino was formerly managing partner and CEO of Arthur Andersen and chairman and CEO of Profectus Bioscience.

== Career ==
=== Arthur Andersen ===
Berardino joined Arthur Andersen in 1972, after graduating from the Fairfield University Dolan School of Business with a B.S. in accounting. He was admitted to the partnership in 1982, rising to head of Andersen's U.S. audit practice.

In 1998, then United States Securities and Exchange Commission (SEC) Chairman Arthur Levitt launched an attack on the auditing business. At that time, it was felt that accounting firms were conflicted by selling consulting services to the same companies whose books they were auditing. In 2000, Berardino negotiated a compromise with the SEC. Auditing and consulting fees would henceforth be disclosed. At Andersen, Berardino was admired for having negotiated this compromise, because a prohibition from signing consulting contracts with audit clients would have been very damaging to Andersen's business. Levitt praised Berardino's leadership in his book Take on the Street....

Berardino became managing partner – chief executive officer of Andersen Worldwide (the governing body of Andersen's operations in 84 countries including 85,000 people) in January 2001 shortly after its split with Andersen Consulting (Accenture). When Andersen's client Enron declared bankruptcy in the highly publicized Enron scandal, Berardino appeared before Congress and announced a series of steps to improve Andersen and the accounting profession. In early 2002, when Andersen discovered that its auditors had been involved with shredding documents related to the Enron audit, Berardino disclosed this activity voluntarily to the U.S. Department of Justice and the SEC. While in Tokyo meeting with Asia-Pacific partners in an attempt to keep the firm together, Berardino received the news that the U.S. Justice Department was likely to indict the firm.

Berardino hired former Federal Reserve chairman Paul Volcker in February 2002 to create an independent oversight board and reform Andersen into a pure auditing business. On March 14, 2002, the Justice Department indicted Andersen for obstruction of justice based on the document shredding which took place.

Initially, the firm's 18-strong Board of partners asked Berardino to stay on. He resigned on March 26, 2002, in the hope that justice would reconsider the indictment. They did not, and Andersen was convicted of obstruction of justice on June 15, 2002. By the end of August, it surrendered its licenses to audit public companies in the US.

In 2006, the Supreme Court of the U.S. overturned this conviction in a unanimous opinion. It was a symbolic victory for the defunct accounting firm.

=== Profectus BioScience ===
He was chairman and chief executive officer of Profectus BioSciences in Baltimore, Maryland up until January 24, 2008. Berardino continued with the company as a director through 2010. He had joined the company as a director in 2004. Profectus Biosciences, Inc. is a biotechnology start-up that develops therapeutic and vaccine technologies intended to reduce the morbidity and mortality caused by viral diseases. The company's near-term target is the Human Immunodeficiency Virus (HIV). On the vaccine front, Profectus is trying to target HIV as it attempts to enter a cell. The company's therapies aim to cool the body's overheated immune system after it is infected with HIV. Profectus is a spin-off from the Institute of Human Virology and was created to commercialize its work.

=== Alvarez & Marsal ===
Berardino is currently a managing director (since 2008) based in New York. Joe works with public companies in need of corporate transformation typically caused by disruptions to their historic business models.

== Affiliations ==
Berardino served on the boards of directors of Quiksilver (NYSE:ZQK); ValueVision Media (aka ShopHQ from 2008 to 2012; NASDAQ:VVTV) and Neuberger Berman from 2011 to 2012 and has served for eighteen years on the board of trustees of Fairfield University. He has served since 2019 until 2022 on the board of directors of ettain, a company owned by Alvarez & Marsal Capital Partners and its employees. In 2001, he received Fairfield University's Beta Alpha Sigma Award, as well as a Doctor of Law, Honoras Causas, from the University of the East in the Philippines. In 2004, Berardino was invested as a Knight of Malta and 2020 as a Knight of Obedience. In 2024 Berardino was elected to the board and in 2026 as President of the Pilgrimage Foundation. Its primary mission is to underwrite annual pilgrimages to Lourdes, France sponsored by the American Association of the Order of Malta for “malades” and their caregivers in search of a spiritual if not physical healing in a small village in south western France known for miraculous experiences.
