= Enron scandal =

2001 accounting scandal

Enron logo

The Enron scandal was an accounting scandal sparked by American energy company Enron Corporation filing for bankruptcy after news of widespread internal fraud became public in October 2001, which led to the dissolution of its accounting firm, Arthur Andersen, previously one of the five largest in the world. The largest bankruptcy reorganization in U.S. history at that time, Enron was cited as the biggest audit failure.

Enron was formed in 1985 by Kenneth Lay after merging Houston Natural Gas and InterNorth. Several years later, when Jeffrey Skilling was hired, Lay developed a staff of executives that – by the use of accounting loopholes, the misuse of mark-to-market accounting, special purpose entities, and poor financial reporting – were able to hide billions of dollars in debt from failed deals and projects. Chief Financial Officer Andrew Fastow and other executives misled Enron's board of directors and audit committee on high-risk accounting practices and pressured Arthur Andersen to ignore the issues.

Shareholders filed a $40 billion lawsuit, for which they were eventually partially compensated $7.2 billion, after the company's stock price plummeted from a high of US$90.75 per share in August 2000 to less than $1 by the end of November 2001.

The Securities and Exchange Commission (SEC) began an investigation, and rival Houston competitor Dynegy offered to purchase the company at a very low price. The deal failed, and on December 2, 2001, Enron filed for bankruptcy under Chapter 11 of the United States Bankruptcy Code. Enron's $63.4 billion in assets made it the largest corporate bankruptcy in U.S. history until the WorldCom scandal the following year.

Many executives at Enron were indicted for a variety of charges and some were later sentenced to prison, including former CEO Jeffrey Skilling. Kenneth Lay, then the CEO and chairman, was indicted and convicted but died before being sentenced. Arthur Andersen LLC was found guilty of illegally destroying documents relevant to the SEC investigation, which voided its license to audit public companies and effectively closed the firm. By the time the ruling was overturned at the Supreme Court, Arthur Andersen had lost the majority of its customers and had ceased operating. Enron employees and shareholders received limited returns in lawsuits, and lost billions in pensions and stock prices.

As a consequence of the scandal, new regulations and legislation were enacted to expand the accuracy of financial reporting for public companies. One piece of legislation, the Sarbanes–Oxley Act, increased penalties for destroying, altering, or fabricating records in federal investigations or for attempting to defraud shareholders. The act also increased the accountability of auditing firms to remain unbiased and independent of their clients.

== Rise of Enron ==
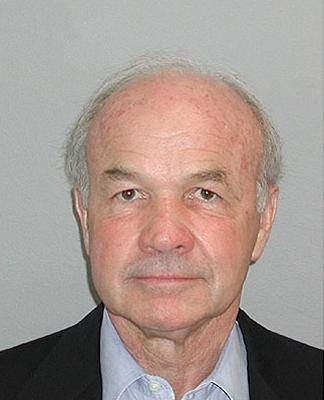
Kenneth Lay in a July 2004 mugshot

In 1985, Kenneth Lay merged the natural gas pipeline companies of Houston Natural Gas and InterNorth to form a multi-billion dollar company. Just a year later, they then changed the name to Enron. In the early 1990s, Lay helped to initiate the selling of electricity at market prices and soon after, Congress approved legislation deregulating the sale of natural gas. The resulting markets made it possible for traders such as Enron to sell energy at higher prices, thereby significantly increasing its revenue. After producers and local governments decried the resultant price volatility and asked for increased regulation, strong lobbying on the part of Enron and others prevented such regulation. Enron changed from being a natural gas producer and supplier to a trader of energy derivative contracts with the assistance of Jeffrey Skilling, who joined the company as a consultant before rising to the position of chief operating officer.

As Enron became the largest seller of natural gas in North America by 1992, its trading of gas contracts earned $122 million (before interest and taxes), the second largest contributor to the company's net income. The November 1999 creation of the EnronOnline trading website allowed the company to manage its contracts trading business better.

In an attempt to achieve further growth, Enron pursued a diversification strategy. The company owned and operated a variety of assets including gas pipelines, electricity plants, paper plants, water plants, and broadband services across the globe. Enron also gained additional revenue by trading contracts for the same array of products and services it was involved in. This included setting up power generation plants in developing countries and emerging markets including the Philippines (Subic Bay), Indonesia and India (Dabhol).

The bull market of the 1990s helped to fuel Enron’s ambitions and contributed to its rapid growth. Enron's stock increased from the start of the 1990s until year-end 1998 by 311%, only modestly higher than the average rate of growth in the Standard & Poor 500 index. However, the stock increased by 56% in 1999 and a further 87% in 2000, compared to a 20% increase and a 10% decrease for the index during the same years. By December 31, 2000, Enron's stock was priced at $83.13 and its market capitalization exceeded $60 billion, 70 times earnings and six times book value, an indication of the stock market's high expectations about its prospects. In addition, Enron was rated the most innovative large company in America in Fortune's Most Admired Companies survey.

== Causes of downfall ==
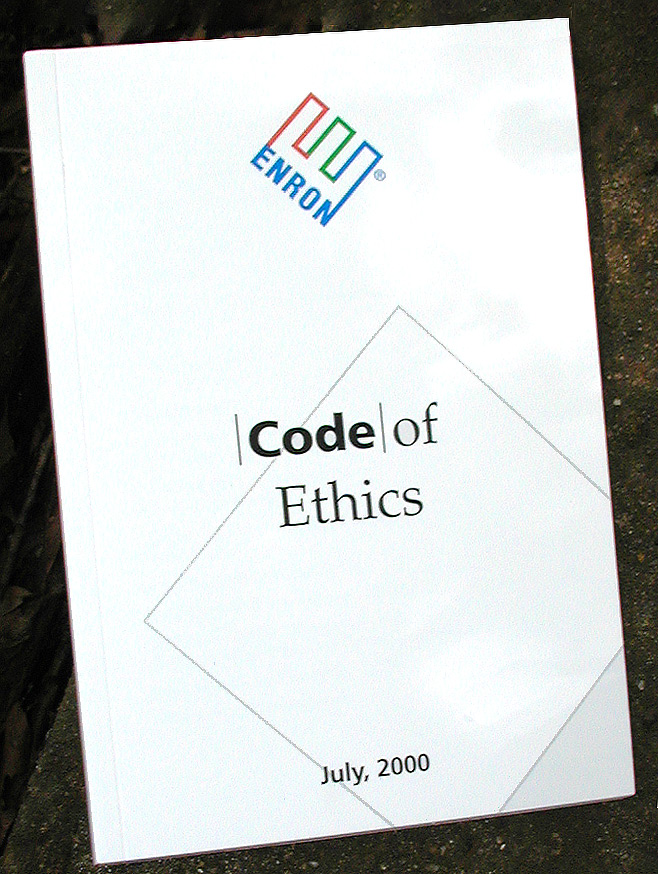
The Enron Code of Ethics from July 2000, about a year before the company collapsed

Enron's complex financial statements were confusing to shareholders and analysts. When speculative business ventures proved disastrous, it used unethical practices to use accounting limitations to misrepresent earnings and modify the balance sheet to indicate favorable performance.

The combination of these issues later resulted in the bankruptcy of Enron, and the majority of them were perpetuated by the indirect knowledge or direct actions of Lay, Skilling, Andrew Fastow, and other executives such as Rebecca Mark. Lay served as the chairman of Enron in its last few years, and approved of the actions of Skilling and Fastow, although he did not always inquire about the details. Skilling constantly focused on meeting Wall Street expectations, advocated the use of mark-to-market accounting, accounting based on market value, which was then inflated, and pressured Enron executives to find new ways to hide its debt. Fastow and other executives "created off-balance-sheet vehicles, complex financing structures, and deals so bewildering that few people could understand them."

=== Revenue recognition ===
Enron earned profits by providing services such as wholesale trading and risk management in addition to building and maintaining electric power plants, natural gas pipelines, storage, and processing facilities. When accepting the risk of buying and selling products, merchants are allowed to report the selling price as revenues and the products' costs as the cost of goods sold. In contrast, an "agent" provides a service to the customer, but does not take the same risks as merchants for buying and selling. Service providers, when classified as agents, may report trading and brokerage fees as revenue, although not for the full value of the transaction.

Although trading companies such as Goldman Sachs and Merrill Lynch used the conventional "agent model" for reporting revenue (where only the trading or brokerage fee would be reported as revenue), Enron instead elected to report the entire value of each of its trades as revenue. This "merchant model" was considered much more aggressive in the accounting interpretation than the agent model. Enron's method of reporting inflated trading revenue was later adopted by other companies in the energy trading industry in an attempt to stay competitive with the company's large increase in revenue. Other energy companies such as Duke Energy, Reliant Energy, and Dynegy joined Enron in the largest 50 of the revenue-based Fortune 500 owing mainly to their adoption of the same trading revenue accounting as Enron.

Between 1996 and 2000, Enron's revenues increased by more than 750%, rising from $13.3 billion in 1996 to $100.7 billion in 2000. This expansion of 65% per year was extraordinary in any industry, including the energy industry, which typically considered growth of 2–3% per year to be respectable. For just the first nine months of 2001, Enron reported $138.7 billion in revenues, placing the company at the sixth position on the Fortune Global 500.

Enron also used creative accounting tricks and purposefully misclassified loan transactions as sales close to quarterly reporting deadlines, similar to the Lehman Brothers Repo 105 scheme in the 2008 financial crisis, or the currency swap concealment of Greek debt by Goldman Sachs. In Enron's case, Merrill Lynch bought Nigerian barges with an alleged buyback guarantee by Enron shortly before the earnings deadline. According to the government, Enron misreported a bridge loan as a true sale, then bought back the barges a few months later. Merrill Lynch executives were tried and in November 2004 convicted for aiding Enron in fraudulent accounting activities. These charges were thrown out on appeal in 2006, after the Merrill Lynch executives had spent nearly a year in prison, with the 5th U.S. Circuit Court of Appeals in New Orleans calling the conspiracy and wire fraud charges "flawed". Expert observers said that the reversal was highly unusual for the 5th Circuit, commenting that the conviction must have had serious issues in order to be overturned. The Justice Department decided not to retry the case after the reversal of the verdict.

=== Mark-to-market accounting ===
In Enron's natural gas business, the accounting had previously been fairly straightforward: in each period, the company listed the actual costs of supplying the gas and actual revenues received from selling it. However, when Skilling joined Enron, he demanded that the trading business adopt mark-to-market accounting, claiming that it would represent "true economic value". Enron became the first nonfinancial company to use the method to account for its complex long-term contracts. Mark-to-market accounting requires that once a long-term contract has been signed, income is estimated as the present value of net future cash flow. Often, the viability of these contracts and their related costs were difficult to estimate. Owing to the large discrepancies between reported profits and cash, investors were typically given false or misleading reports. Under this method, income from projects could be recorded, although the firm might never have received the money, with this income increasing financial earnings on the books. However, because in future years the profits could not be included, new and additional income had to be included from more projects to develop additional growth to appease investors. As one Enron competitor stated, "If you accelerate your income, then you have to keep doing more and more deals to show the same or rising income." Despite potential pitfalls, the U.S. Securities and Exchange Commission (SEC) approved the accounting method for Enron in its trading of natural gas futures contracts on January 30, 1992. However, Enron later expanded its use to other areas in the company to help it meet Wall Street projections.

For one contract, in July 2000, Enron and Blockbuster Video signed a 20-year agreement to introduce on-demand entertainment to various U.S. cities by year's end. After several pilot projects, Enron claimed estimated profits of more than $110 million from the deal, even though analysts questioned the technical viability and market demand for the service. The parties withdrew from the contract in March 2001, but Enron continued to claim future profits, even though the deal resulted in a loss.

=== Special purpose entities ===
Enron used special purpose entities—limited partnerships or companies created to fulfill a temporary or specific purpose to fund or manage risks associated with specific assets. The company elected to disclose minimal details on its use of "special purpose entities". These shell companies were created by a sponsor, but funded by independent equity investors and debt financing. For financial reporting purposes, a series of rules dictate whether a special purpose entity is a separate entity from the sponsor. In total, by 2001, Enron had used hundreds of special purpose entities to hide its debt. The company used a number of special purpose entities, such as partnerships in its Thomas and Condor tax shelters, financial asset securitization investment trusts (FASITs) in the Apache deal, real estate mortgage investment conduits (REMICs) in the Steele deal, and REMICs and real estate investment trusts (REITs) in the Cochise deal.

The special purpose entities were Tobashi schemes used for more than just circumventing accounting conventions. As a result of one violation, Enron's balance sheet understated its liabilities and overstated its equity, and its earnings were overstated. Enron disclosed to its shareholders that it had hedged downside risk in its own illiquid investments using special purpose entities. However, investors were oblivious to the fact that the special purpose entities were actually using the company's own stock and financial guarantees to finance these hedges. This prevented Enron from being protected from the downside risk.

==== JEDI and Chewco ====
In 1993, Enron established a joint venture in energy investments with CalPERS, the California state pension fund, called the Joint Energy Development Investments (JEDI). In 1997, Skilling, serving as Enron's chief operating officer (COO), asked CalPERS to join Enron in a separate investment. CalPERS was interested in the idea, but only if it could be terminated as a partner in JEDI. However, Enron did not want to show any debt from assuming CalPERS' stake in JEDI on its balance sheet. Chief Financial Officer (CFO) Fastow developed the special purpose entity Chewco Investments, a limited partnership (L.P.) that raised debt guaranteed by Enron and was used to acquire CalPERS's joint venture stake for $383 million. Because of Fastow's organization of Chewco, JEDI's losses were kept off of Enron's balance sheet.

In autumn of 2001, CalPERS and Enron's arrangement was discovered, which required the discontinuation of Enron's prior accounting method for Chewco and JEDI. This disqualification revealed that Enron's reported earnings from 1997 to mid-2001 would need to be reduced by $405 million and that the company's indebtedness would increase by $628 million.

==== Whitewing ====
Whitewing was the name of a special purpose entity used as a financing method by Enron. In December 1997, with funding of $579 million provided by Enron and $500 million by an outside investor, Whitewing Associates L.P. was formed. Two years later, the entity's arrangement was changed so that it would no longer be consolidated with Enron and be counted on the company's balance sheet. Whitewing was used to purchase Enron assets, including stakes in power plants, pipelines, stocks, and other investments. Between 1999 and 2001, Whitewing bought assets from Enron worth $2 billion, using Enron stock as collateral. Although the transactions were approved by the Enron board, the asset transfers were not true sales and should have been treated instead as loans.

==== LJM and Raptors ====
In 1999, Fastow formulated two limited partnerships: LJM Cayman. L.P. (LJM1) and LJM2 Co-Investment L.P. (LJM2), to buy Enron's poorly performing stocks and stakes to improve its financial statements. LJM 1 and 2 were created solely to serve as the outside equity investor needed for the special purpose entities that were being used by Enron. Fastow had to go before the board of directors to receive an exemption from Enron's code of ethics (as he had the title of CFO) in order to manage the companies. The two partnerships were funded with around $390 million provided by Wachovia, J.P. Morgan Chase, Credit Suisse First Boston, Citigroup, and other investors. Merrill Lynch, which marketed the equity, also contributed $22 million to fund the entities.

Enron transferred to "Raptor I-IV", four LJM-related special purpose entities named after the velociraptors in Jurassic Park, more than "$1.2 billion in assets, including millions of shares of Enron common stock and long-term rights to purchase millions more shares, plus $150 million of Enron notes payable" as disclosed in the company's financial statement footnotes. The special purpose entities had been used to pay for all of this using the entities' debt instruments. The footnotes also declared that the instruments' face amount totaled $1.5 billion, and the entities notional amount of $2.1 billion had been used to enter into derivative contracts with Enron.

Enron capitalized the Raptors, and, in a manner similar to the accounting employed when a company issues stock at a public offering, then booked the notes payable issued as assets on its balance sheet while increasing the shareholders' equity for the same amount. This treatment later became an issue for Enron and its auditor Arthur Andersen, as removing it from the balance sheet resulted in a $1.2 billion decrease in net shareholders' equity.

Eventually, the derivative contracts worth $2.1 billion lost significant value. Swaps were established at the time the stock price achieved its maximum. During the ensuing year, the value of the portfolio under the swaps fell by $1.1 billion as the stock prices decreased (the loss of value meant that the special purpose entities technically now owed Enron $1.1 billion by the contracts). Enron, using its mark-to-market accounting method, claimed a $500 million gain on the swap contracts in its 2000 annual report. The gain was responsible for offsetting its stock portfolio losses and was attributed to nearly a third of Enron's earnings for 2000 (before it was properly restated in 2001).

=== Corporate governance ===
On paper, Enron had a model board of directors comprising predominantly outsiders with significant ownership stakes and a talented audit committee. In its 2000 review of best corporate boards, Chief Executive included Enron among its five best boards. Even with its complex corporate governance and network of intermediaries, Enron was still able to "attract large sums of capital to fund a questionable business model, conceal its true performance through a series of accounting and financing maneuvers, and hype its stock to unsustainable levels."

==== Executive compensation ====
Although Enron's compensation and performance management system was designed to retain and reward its most valuable employees, the system contributed to a dysfunctional corporate culture that became obsessed with short-term earnings to maximize bonuses. Employees constantly tried to start deals, often disregarding the quality of cash flow or profits, in order to get a better rating for their performance review. Additionally, accounting results were recorded as soon as possible to keep up with the company's stock price. This practice helped ensure deal-makers and executives received large cash bonuses and stock options.

Enron was constantly emphasizing its stock price. Management was compensated extensively using stock options, similar to other U.S. companies. This policy of stock option awards caused management to create expectations of rapid growth in efforts to give the appearance of reported earnings to meet Wall Street's expectations. Stock tickers were installed in lobbies, elevators, and on company computers. At budget meetings, Skilling would develop target earnings by asking, "What earnings do you need to keep our stock price up?" and that number would be used, even if it was not feasible. On December 31, 2000, Enron had 96 million shares outstanding as stock option plans (approximately 13% of common shares outstanding). Enron's proxy statement stated that, within three years, these awards were expected to be exercised. Using Enron's January 2001 stock price of $83.13 and the directors' beneficial ownership reported in the 2001 proxy, the value of director stock ownership was $659 million for Lay, and $174 million for Skilling.

Skilling believed that if Enron employees were constantly worried about cost, it would hinder original thinking. As a result, extravagant spending was rampant throughout the company, especially among the executives. Employees had large expense accounts and many executives were paid sometimes twice as much as competitors. In 1998, the top 200 highest-paid employees received $193 million from salaries, bonuses, and stock. Two years later, the figure jumped to $1.4 billion.

==== Risk management ====
Before its demise, Enron was lauded for its sophisticated financial risk management tools. Risk management was crucial to Enron not only because of its regulatory environment, but also because of its business plan. Enron established long-term fixed commitments that needed to be hedged to prepare for the invariable fluctuation of future energy prices. Enron's downfall was attributed to its reckless use of derivatives and special purpose entities. By hedging its risks with special purpose entities that it owned, Enron retained the risks associated with the transactions. This arrangement had Enron implementing hedges with itself.

Enron's aggressive accounting practices were not hidden from the board of directors, as later learned by a Senate subcommittee. The board was informed of the rationale for using the Whitewing, LJM, and Raptor transactions, and after approving them, received status updates on the entities' operations. Although not all of Enron's widespread improper accounting practices were revealed to the board, the practices were dependent on board decisions. Even though Enron extensively relied on derivatives for its business, the company's finance committee and board did not have enough experience with derivatives to understand what they were being told. The Senate subcommittee argued that had there been a detailed understanding of how the derivatives were organized, the board would have prevented their use.

==== Financial audit ====
Enron's accounting firm, Arthur Andersen, was accused of applying reckless standards in its audits because of a conflict of interest over the significant consulting fees generated by Enron. During 2000, Andersen earned $25 million in audit fees and $27 million in consulting fees (this amount accounted for roughly 27% of the audit fees of public clients for Andersen's Houston office). The auditor's methods were questioned as either being completed solely to receive its annual fees or for its lack of expertise in properly reviewing Enron's revenue recognition, special entities, derivatives, and other accounting practices.

Enron hired numerous Certified Public Accountants (CPAs) as well as accountants who had worked on developing accounting rules with the Financial Accounting Standards Board (FASB). The accountants searched for new ways to save the company money, including capitalizing on loopholes found in Generally Accepted Accounting Principles (GAAP), the accounting industry's standards. One Enron accountant revealed "We tried to aggressively use the literature [GAAP] to our advantage. All the rules create all these opportunities. We got to where we did because we exploited that weakness."

Andersen's auditors were pressured by Enron's management to defer recognizing the charges from the special purpose entities as its credit risks became known. Since the entities would never return a profit, accounting guidelines required that Enron should take a write-off, where the value of the entity was removed from the balance sheet at a loss. To pressure Andersen into meeting earnings expectations, Enron would occasionally allow accounting companies Ernst & Young or PricewaterhouseCoopers to complete accounting tasks to create the illusion of hiring a new company to replace Andersen. Although Andersen was equipped with internal controls to protect against conflicted incentives of local partners, it failed to prevent conflict of interest. In one case, Andersen's Houston office, which performed the Enron audit, was able to overrule any critical reviews of Enron's accounting decisions by Andersen's Chicago partner. In addition, after news of SEC investigations of Enron were made public, Andersen would later shred several tons of relevant documents and delete nearly 30,000 e-mails and computer files, leading to accusations of a cover-up.

Revelations concerning Andersen's overall performance led to the break-up of the firm, and to the following assessment by the Powers Committee (appointed by Enron's board to look into the firm's accounting in October 2001): "The evidence available to us suggests that Andersen did not fulfill its professional responsibilities in connection with its audits of Enron's financial statements, or its obligation to bring to the attention of Enron's Board (or the Audit and Compliance Committee) concerns about Enron's internal contracts over the related-party transactions".

==== Audit committee ====
Corporate audit committees usually meet just a few times during the year, and their members typically have only modest experience with accounting and finance. Enron's audit committee had more expertise than many others. It included:

- Robert K. Jaedicke, an accounting professor at Stanford University and former dean of Stanford Business School
- John Mendelsohn, President of the University of Texas M.D. Anderson Cancer Center
- Paulo Pereira, former president and CEO of the State Bank of Rio de Janeiro in Brazil
- John Wakeham, former United Kingdom Secretary of State for Energy and Parliamentary Secretary to the Treasury
- Ronnie Chan, Chairman of Hong Kong Hang Lung Group
- Wendy Gramm, former Chair of U.S. Commodity Futures Trading Commission

Enron's audit committee was later criticized for its brief meetings that would cover large amounts of material. In one meeting on February 12, 2001, the committee met for an hour and a half. Enron's audit committee did not have the technical knowledge to question the auditors properly on accounting issues related to the company's special purpose entities. The committee was also unable to question the company's management due to pressures on the committee. The United States Senate Permanent Subcommittee on Investigations of the Committee on Governmental Affairs' report accused the board members of allowing conflicts of interest to impede their duties as monitoring the company's accounting practices. When Enron's scandal became public, the audit committee's conflicts of interest were regarded with suspicion.

==== Ethical and political analyses ====
Commentators attributed the mismanagement behind Enron's fall to a variety of ethical and political-economic causes. Ethical explanations centered on executive greed and hubris, a lack of corporate social responsibility, situation ethics, and get-it-done business pragmatism. Political-economic explanations cited post-1970s deregulation, and inadequate staff and funding for regulatory oversight.

=== Other accounting issues ===
Enron made a habit of booking costs of cancelled projects as assets, with the rationale that no official letter had stated that the project was cancelled. This method was known as "the snowball", and although it was initially dictated that such practices be used only for projects worth less than $90 million, it was later increased to $200 million.

In 1998, when analysts were given a tour of the Enron Energy Services office, they were impressed with how the employees were working so vigorously. In reality, Skilling had moved other employees to the office from other departments (instructing them to pretend to work hard) to create the appearance that the division was larger than it was. This ruse was used several times to fool analysts about the progress of different areas of Enron to help improve the stock price.

=== Speculative business ventures ===
Enron division Azurix, slated for an IPO, initially planned to bid between $321 million and $353 million for the rights to operate water system services for areas around Buenos Aires. This was at the high end of what Enron's Risk Assessment and Control Group advised. But as pressure to outbid all others and win the deal grew more intense with the approaching IPO, the Azurix executives decided to up their bid. They eventually bid $438.6 million, which turned out to be about twice as much as the next highest sealed bid. But when Enron executives arrived at the Argentine facilities, they found them in shambles, with all of the customer records destroyed.

== Timeline of downfall ==
At the beginning of 2001, the Enron Corporation, the world's dominant energy trader, appeared unstoppable. The company's decade-long effort to persuade lawmakers to deregulate electricity markets had succeeded from California to New York. Its ties to the Bush administration assured that its views would be heard in Washington. Its sales, profits and stock were soaring.

— A. Berenson and R. A. Oppel, Jr. The New York Times, October 28, 2001

On September 20, 2000, Jonathan Weil, a reporter at The Wall Street Journal bureau in Dallas wrote a story about how mark-to-market accounting had become prevalent in the energy industry. He noted that outsiders had no real way of knowing the assumptions on which companies that used mark-to-market based their earnings. While the story only appeared in the Texas Journal, the Texas regional edition of the Journal, short-seller Jim Chanos happened to read it and decided to check Enron's annual "10-K" financial report for himself. Chanos did not think it made sense that Enron's broadband unit appeared to far outpace a then-troubled broadband industry. He also noticed that Enron was spending much of its invested capital, and was alarmed by the large amounts of stock being sold by insiders. In November 2000, he decided to short Enron's stock.

In February 2001, Chief Accounting Officer Rick Causey told budget managers: "From an accounting standpoint, this will be our easiest year ever. We've got 2001 in the bag." On March 5, Bethany McLean's Fortune article "Is Enron Overpriced?" questioned how Enron could maintain its high stock value, which was trading at 55 times its earnings, arguing that analysts and investors did not know exactly how the company made money. McLean was first drawn to the company's financial situation after Chanos suggested she view the company's 10-K for herself. In a post-mortem interview with The Washington Post, she recalled finding "strange transactions", "erratic cash flow", and "huge debt". The debt was the biggest red flag to McLean; she wondered how a supposedly profitable company could be "adding debt at such a rapid rate". Later, in her book, The Smartest Guys in the Room, McLean recalled speaking off the record with a number of people in the investment community who were growing skeptical about Enron.

McLean telephoned Skilling to discuss her findings prior to publishing the article, but he called her "unethical" for not properly researching his company. Fastow claimed that Enron could not reveal earnings details as the company had more than 1,200 trading books for assorted commodities and did "... not want anyone to know what's on those books. We don't want to tell anyone where we're making money."

In a conference call on April 17, 2001, then-Chief Executive Officer (CEO) Skilling verbally attacked Wall Street analyst Richard Grubman, who questioned Enron's unusual accounting practices during a recorded conference call. When Grubman complained that Enron was the only company that could not release a balance sheet along with its earnings statements, Skilling stammered, "Well uh ... Thank you very much, we appreciate it ... Asshole." This became an inside joke among many Enron employees, mocking Grubman for his perceived meddling rather than Skilling's offensiveness, with slogans such as, "Ask Why, Asshole", a variation on Enron's official slogan "Ask why".

By the late 1990s Enron's stock was trading for $80–90 per share, and few seemed to concern themselves with the opacity of the company's financial disclosures. In mid-July 2001, Enron reported revenues of $50.1 billion, almost triple year-to-date, and beating analysts' estimates by 3 cents a share. Despite this, Enron's profit margin had stayed at a modest average of about 2.1%, and its share price had decreased by more than 30% since the same quarter of 2000.

As time passed, a number of serious concerns confronted the company. Enron had recently faced several serious operational challenges, namely logistical difficulties in operating a new broadband communications trading unit, and the losses from constructing the Dabhol Power project, a large gas-powered power plant in India that had been mired in controversy since the beginning in relation to its high pricing and bribery at the highest level. These were subsequently confirmed in the 2002 Senate investigation. There was also increasing criticism of the company for the role that its subsidiary Enron Energy Services had in the California electricity crisis of 2000–2001.

There are no accounting issues, no trading issues, no reserve issues, no previously unknown problem issues. I think I can honestly say that the company is probably in the strongest and best shape that it has probably ever been in.

— Kenneth Lay answering an analyst's question on August 14, 2001

On August 14, Skilling announced he was resigning his position as CEO after only six months citing personal reasons. Observers noted that in the months before his exit, Skilling had sold at minimum 450,000 shares of Enron at a value of around $33 million (though he still owned over a million shares at the date of his departure). Nevertheless, Lay, who was serving as chairman at Enron, assured surprised market watchers that there would be "no change in the performance or outlook of the company going forward" from Skilling's departure. Lay announced he himself would re-assume the position of chief executive officer.

On August 15, Sherron Watkins, vice president for corporate development, sent an anonymous letter to Lay warning him about the company's accounting practices. One statement in the letter said: "I am incredibly nervous that we will implode in a wave of accounting scandals." Watkins contacted a friend who worked for Arthur Andersen and he drafted a memorandum to give to the audit partners about the points she raised. On August 22, Watkins met individually with Lay and gave him a six-page letter further explaining Enron's accounting issues. Lay questioned her as to whether she had told anyone outside of the company and then vowed to have the company's law firm, Vinson & Elkins, review the issues, despite Watkins arguing that using the law firm would present a conflict of interest. Lay consulted with other executives, and although they wanted to dismiss Watkins (as Texas law did not protect company whistleblowers), they decided against it to prevent a lawsuit.

On October 15, Vinson & Elkins announced that Enron had done nothing wrong in its accounting practices as Andersen had approved each issue.

=== Investors' confidence declines ===
Something is rotten with the state of Enron.

— The New York Times, September 9, 2001

By the end of August 2001, his company's stock value still falling, Lay named Greg Whalley, president and COO of Enron Wholesale Services, to succeed Skilling as president and COO of the entire company. He also named Mark Frevert as vice chairman, and appointed Whalley and Frevert to positions in the chairman's office. Some observers suggested that Enron's investors were in significant need of reassurance, not only because the company's business was difficult to understand (even "indecipherable") but also because it was difficult to properly describe the company in financial statements. One analyst stated "it's really hard for analysts to determine where [Enron] are making money in a given quarter and where they are losing money." Lay accepted that Enron's business was very complex, but asserted that analysts would "never get all the information they want" to satisfy their curiosity. He also explained that the complexity of the business was due largely to tax strategies and position-hedging. Lay's efforts seemed to meet with limited success; by September 9, one prominent hedge fund manager noted that "[Enron] stock is trading under a cloud." The sudden departure of Skilling combined with the opacity of Enron's accounting books made proper assessment difficult for Wall Street. In addition, the company admitted to repeatedly using "related-party transactions", which some feared could be too easily used to transfer losses that might otherwise appear on Enron's own balance sheet. A particularly troubling aspect of this technique was that several of the "related-party" entities had been or were being controlled by CFO Fastow.

After the September 11 attacks, media attention shifted away from the company and its troubles. A little less than a month later, Enron announced its intention to begin the process of selling its lower-margin assets in favor of its core businesses of gas and electricity trading. This policy included selling Portland General Electric to another Oregon utility, Northwest Natural Gas, for about $1.9 billion in cash and stock, and possibly selling its 65% stake in the Dabhol project in India.

=== Restructuring losses and SEC investigation ===
On October 16, 2001, Enron announced that restatements to its financial statements for years 1997 to 2000 were necessary to correct accounting violations. The restatements for the period reduced earnings by $613 million (or 23% of reported profits during the period), increased liabilities at the end of 2000 by $628 million (6% of reported liabilities and 5.5% of reported equity), and reduced equity at the end of 2000 by $1.2 billion (10% of reported equity). Additionally, in January Skilling had asserted that the broadband unit alone was worth $35 billion, a claim also mistrusted. An analyst at Standard & Poor's said, "I don't think anyone knows what the broadband operation is worth."

Enron's management team claimed the losses were mostly due to investment losses, along with charges such as about $180 million in money spent restructuring the company's troubled broadband trading unit. In a statement, Lay said, "After a thorough review of our businesses, we have decided to take these charges to clear away issues that have clouded the performance and earnings potential of our core energy businesses." Some analysts were unnerved. David Fleischer at Goldman Sachs, an analyst termed previously 'one of the company's strongest supporters' asserted that the Enron management "... lost credibility and have to reprove themselves. They need to convince investors these earnings are real, that the company is for real and that growth will be realized."

Fastow disclosed to Enron's board of directors on October 22 that he earned $30 million from compensation arrangements when managing the LJM limited partnerships. That day, the share price of Enron decreased to $20.65, down $5.40 in one day, after the announcement by the SEC that it was investigating several suspicious deals struck by Enron, characterizing them as "some of the most opaque transactions with insiders ever seen". Attempting to explain the billion-dollar charge and calm investors, Enron's disclosures spoke of "share settled costless collar arrangements", "derivative instruments which eliminated the contingent nature of existing restricted forward contracts," and strategies that served "to hedge certain merchant investments and other assets." Such puzzling phraseology left many analysts feeling ignorant about just how Enron managed its business. Regarding the SEC investigation, chairman and CEO Lay said, "We will cooperate fully with the SEC and look forward to the opportunity to put any concern about these transactions to rest."

Two days later, on October 25, Fastow was removed as CFO, despite Lay's assurances as early as the previous day that he and the board had confidence in him. In announcing Fastow's ouster, Lay said, "In my continued discussions with the financial community, it became clear to me that restoring investor confidence would require us to replace Andy as CFO." The move came after several banks refused to issue loans to Enron as long as Fastow remained CFO. However, with Skilling and Fastow now both departed, some analysts feared that revealing the company's practices would be made all the more difficult. Enron's stock was now trading at $16.41, having lost half its value in a little more than a week.

Jeff McMahon, head of industrial markets, succeeded Fastow as CFO. His first task was to deal with a cash crisis. A day earlier, Enron discovered that it was unable to roll its commercial paper, effectively losing access to several billion dollars in financing. The company had actually experienced difficulty selling its commercial paper for a week, but was now unable to sell even overnight paper. On October 27 the company began buying back all its commercial paper, valued at around $3.3 billion, in an effort to calm investor fears about Enron's supply of cash. Enron financed the re-purchase by depleting its lines of credit at several banks. While the company's debt rating was still considered investment-grade, its bonds were trading at levels slightly less, making future sales problematic. It soon emerged that Fastow had been so focused on creating off-balance sheet vehicles that he had all but ignored some of the most rudimentary aspects of corporate finance. McMahon and a "financial SWAT team" put together to find a way out of the cash crisis discovered that under Fastow's watch, Enron only operated on a quarterly basis. Fastow never developed procedures for tracking cash or debt maturities that were common for companies of Enron's stature. For all intents and purposes, Enron was illiquid.

As the month came to a close, serious concerns were being raised by some observers regarding Enron's possible manipulation of accepted accounting rules; however, analysis was claimed to be impossible based on the incomplete information provided by Enron. Industry analysts feared that Enron was the new Long-Term Capital Management, the hedge fund whose bankruptcy in 1998 threatened systemic failure of the international financial markets. Enron's tremendous presence worried some about the consequences of the company's possible bankruptcy. Enron executives accepted questions in written form only.

=== Credit rating downgrade ===
The main short-term danger to Enron's survival at the end of October 2001 seemed to be its credit rating. It was reported at the time that Moody's and Fitch, two of the three biggest credit-rating agencies, had slated Enron for review for possible downgrade. Such a downgrade would force Enron to issue millions of shares of stock to cover loans it had guaranteed, which would decrease the value of existing stock further. Additionally, all manner of companies began reviewing their existing contracts with Enron, especially in the long term, in the event that Enron's rating were lowered below investment grade, a possible hindrance for future transactions.

Analysts and observers continued their complaints regarding the difficulty or impossibility of properly assessing a company whose financial statements were so cryptic. Some feared that no one at Enron apart from Skilling and Fastow could completely explain years of mysterious transactions. "You're getting way over my head", said Lay during late August 2001 in response to detailed questions about Enron's business, a reaction that worried analysts.

On October 29, responding to growing concerns that Enron might have insufficient cash on hand, news spread that Enron was seeking a further $1–2 billion in financing from banks. The next day, as feared, Moody's lowered Enron's credit rating from Baa1 to Baa2, two levels above junk status. Standard & Poor's affirmed Enron's rating of BBB+, the equivalent of Moody's Baa1. Moody's also warned that it would downgrade Enron's commercial paper rating, the consequence of which would likely prevent the company from finding the further financing it sought to keep solvent.

November began with the disclosure that the SEC was now pursuing a formal investigation, prompted by questions related to Enron's dealings with "related parties". Enron's board also announced that it would commission a special committee to investigate the transactions, directed by William C. Powers, the dean of the University of Texas law school. The next day, an editorial in The New York Times demanded an "aggressive" investigation into the matter. Enron was able to secure an additional $1 billion in financing from cross-town rival Dynegy on November 2, but the news was not universally admired in that the debt was secured by assets from the company's valuable Northern Natural Gas and Transwestern Pipeline.

=== Proposed buyout by Dynegy ===
Sources claimed that Enron was planning to explain its business practices more fully within the coming days, as a confidence-building gesture. Enron's stock was now trading at around $7, and by this time it was obvious that Enron could not stay independent. However, investors worried that the company would not be able to find a buyer.

After Enron had received a wide spectrum of rejections, Enron management apparently found a buyer when the board of Dynegy, another energy trader based in Houston, voted late at night on November 7 to acquire Enron at a very low price of about $8 billion in stock. Chevron Texaco, which at the time owned about a quarter of Dynegy, agreed to provide Enron with $2.5 billion in cash, specifically $1 billion at first and the rest when the deal was completed. Dynegy would also be required to assume nearly $13 billion of debt, plus any other debt hitherto occluded by the Enron management's secretive business practices, possibly as much as $10 billion in "hidden" debt. Dynegy and Enron confirmed their deal on November 8, 2001.

With Enron in a state of near collapse, the deal was largely on Dynegy's terms. Dynegy would be the surviving company, and Dynegy CEO Charles Watson and his management team would head the merged company. Enron shareholders would get a 40 percent stake in the enlarged Dynegy, and Enron would get three seats on the merged company's board. Lay would not have any management role, though it was presumed he would get one of Enron's seats on the board. Of Enron's senior executives, only Whalley would join the merged company's C-suite, as an executive vice president. Dynegy agreed to invest $1.5 billion into Enron to keep it alive until the deal closed.

As a measure of how dire Enron's financial picture had become, the company initially balked at paying its bills for November until the credit agencies gave the merger their blessing and allowed Enron to keep its credit at investment grade. By this time, the Dynegy deal was virtually the only thing keeping the company alive, and Enron officials wanted to keep as much cash in the company's coffers in the event of bankruptcy. Had the credit agencies balked at the deal and reduced Enron to junk status, its ability to trade would be severely limited if there was a reduction or elimination of its credit lines with competitors. Ultimately, after Enron and Dynegy retooled the deal to make it harder for Dynegy to trigger the "material adverse change" clause and pull out, Moody's and S&P agreed to drop Enron to one notch above junk status, allowing Enron to pay its bills one day late with interest.

Commentators remarked on the different corporate cultures between Dynegy and Enron, and on Watson's "straight-talking" personality. Some wondered if Enron's troubles had not simply been the result of innocent accounting errors. By November, Enron was asserting that the billion-plus "one-time charges" disclosed in October should in reality have been $200 million, with the rest of the amount simply corrections of dormant accounting mistakes. Many feared other "mistakes" and restatements might yet be revealed.

Another major correction of Enron's earnings was announced on November 9, with a reduction of $591 million of the stated revenue of years 1997–2000. The charges were said to come largely from two special purpose partnerships (JEDI and Chewco). The corrections resulted in the virtual elimination of profit for fiscal year 1997, with significant reductions for the other years. Despite this disclosure, Dynegy declared it still intended to purchase Enron. Both companies were said to be anxious to receive an official assessment of the proposed sale from Moody's and S&P presumably to understand the effect the completion of any buyout transaction would have on Dynegy and Enron's credit rating. In addition, concerns were raised regarding antitrust regulatory restrictions resulting in possible divestiture, along with what to some observers were the radically different corporate cultures of Enron and Dynegy.

Both companies promoted the deal aggressively, and some observers were hopeful; Watson was praised for attempting to create the largest company on the energy market. At the time, Watson said: "We feel [Enron] is a very solid company with plenty of capacity to withstand whatever happens the next few months." One analyst called the deal "a whopper ... a very good deal financially, certainly should be a good deal strategically, and provides some immediate balance-sheet backstop for Enron."

Credit issues were becoming more critical, however. Around the time the buyout was made public, Moody's and S&P publicly announced that they had reduced Enron to just above junk status. In a conference call, S&P affirmed that, were Enron not to be bought, S&P would reduce its rating to low BB or high B, ratings noted as being within junk status. Additionally, many traders had limited their involvement with Enron, or stopped doing business altogether, fearing more bad news. Watson again attempted to re-assure, attesting at a presentation to investors that there was "nothing wrong with Enron's business". He also acknowledged that remunerative steps (in the form of more stock options) would have to be taken to redress the animosity of many Enron employees towards management after it was revealed that Lay and other officials had sold hundreds of millions of dollars' worth of stock during the months prior to the crisis. The situation was not helped by the disclosure that Lay, his "reputation in tatters", stood to receive a payment of $60 million as a change-of-control fee subsequent to the Dynegy acquisition, while many Enron employees had seen their retirement accounts, which were based largely on Enron stock, ravaged as the price decreased 90% in a year. An official at a company owned by Enron stated "We had some married couples who both worked who lost as much as $800,000 or $900,000. It pretty much wiped out every employee's savings plan."

Watson assured investors that the true nature of Enron's business had been made apparent to him: "We have comfort there is not another shoe to drop. If there is no shoe, this is a phenomenally good transaction." Watson further asserted that Enron's energy trading part alone was worth the price Dynegy was paying for the whole company.

By mid-November, Enron announced it was planning to sell about $8 billion worth of underperforming assets, along with a general plan to reduce its scale for the sake of financial stability. On November 19 Enron disclosed to the public further evidence of its critical state of affairs, most pressingly that the company had debt repayment obligations in the range of $9 billion by the end of 2002. Such debts were "vastly in excess" of its available cash. Also, the success of measures to preserve its solvency were not guaranteed, specifically as regarded asset sales and debt refinancing. In a statement, Enron revealed "An adverse outcome with respect to any of these matters would likely have a material adverse impact on Enron's ability to continue as a going concern."

Two days later, on November 21, Wall Street expressed serious doubts that Dynegy would proceed with its deal at all, or would seek to radically renegotiate. Furthermore, Enron revealed in a 10-Q filing that almost all the money it had recently borrowed for purposes including buying its commercial paper, or about $5 billion, had been exhausted in just 50 days. Analysts were unnerved at the revelation, especially since Dynegy was reported to have also been unaware of Enron's rate of cash use. In order to end the proposed buyout, Dynegy would need to legally demonstrate a "material change" in the circumstances of the transaction; as late as November 22, sources close to Dynegy were skeptical that the latest revelations constituted sufficient grounds. Indeed, while Lay assumed that one of his underlings had shared the 10-Q with Dynegy officials, no one at Dynegy saw it until it was released to the public. It subsequently emerged that Enron's traders had grabbed much of the money from Dynegy's cash infusion and used it to guarantee payment to their trading partners when it came time to settle up.

The SEC announced it had filed civil fraud complaints against Andersen. A few days later, sources claimed Enron and Dynegy were renegotiating the terms of their arrangement. Dynegy now demanded Enron agree to be bought for $4 billion rather than the previous $8 billion. Observers were reporting difficulties in ascertaining which of Enron's operations, if any, were profitable. Reports described an en masse shift of business to Enron's competitors for the sake of risk exposure reduction.

=== Bankruptcy ===
Enron's stock price (former NYSE ticker symbol: ENE) from August 23, 2000 ($90) to January 11, 2002 ($0.12). As a result of the decrease of the stock price, shareholders incurred paper losses of nearly $11 billion.

On November 28, 2001, Enron's two worst possible outcomes came true. Credit rating agencies all reduced Enron's credit rating to junk status, and Dynegy's board rejected the merger agreement on Watson's advice. Watson later said, "At the end, you couldn't give it [Enron] to me." Although they had seemingly ironed out a number of outstanding issues at a meeting in New York over the previous weekend, ultimately Dynegy's concerns about Enron's liquidity and dwindling business proved insurmountable. The company had very little cash with which to operate, let alone satisfy enormous debts. Its stock price fell to $0.61 at the end of the day's trading. One editorial observer wrote that "Enron is now shorthand for the perfect financial storm."

Systemic consequences were felt, as Enron's creditors and other energy trading companies suffered the loss of several percentage points. Some analysts felt Enron's failure indicated the risks of the post-September 11 economy, and encouraged traders to lock in profits where they could. The question now became how to determine the total exposure of the markets and other traders to Enron's failure. Early calculations estimated $18.7 billion. One adviser stated, "We don't really know who is out there exposed to Enron's credit. I'm telling my clients to prepare for the worst."

Within 24 hours, speculation abounded that Enron would have no choice but to file for bankruptcy. Enron was estimated to have about $23 billion in liabilities from both debt outstanding and guaranteed loans. Citigroup and JP Morgan Chase in particular appeared to have significant amounts to lose with Enron's bankruptcy. Additionally, many of Enron's major assets were pledged to lenders in order to secure loans, causing doubt about what, if anything, unsecured creditors and eventually stockholders might receive in bankruptcy proceedings. As it turned out, new corporate treasurer Ray Bowen had known as early as the day Dynegy pulled out of the deal that Enron was headed for bankruptcy. He spent most of the next two days scrambling to find a bank who would take Enron's remaining cash after pulling all of its money out of Citibank. He was ultimately forced to make do with a small Houston bank.

By the close of business on November 30, 2001, it was obvious Enron was at the end of its tether. That day, Enron Europe, the holding company for Enron's operations in continental Europe, filed for bankruptcy. The rest of Enron followed suit the following night, December 1, when the board voted unanimously to file for Chapter 11 protection. It became the largest bankruptcy in U.S. history, surpassing the 1970 bankruptcy of the Penn Central (WorldCom's bankruptcy the next year surpassed Enron's bankruptcy so the title was short held), and resulted in 4,000 lost jobs. The day that Enron filed for bankruptcy, thousands of employees were told to pack their belongings and given 30 minutes to vacate the building. Nearly 62% of 15,000 employees' savings plans relied on Enron stock that was purchased at $83 in early 2001 and was now practically worthless.

In its accounting work for Enron, Andersen had been sloppy and weak. But that's how Enron had always wanted it. In truth, even as they angrily pointed fingers, the two deserved each other.

— Bethany McLean and Peter Elkind in The Smartest Guys in the Room

On January 17, 2002, Enron dismissed Arthur Andersen as its auditor, citing its accounting advice and the destruction of documents. Andersen countered that it had already ended its relationship with the company when Enron became bankrupt.

== Trials ==
=== Enron ===
Fastow and his wife, Lea, both pleaded guilty to charges against them. Fastow was initially charged with 98 counts of fraud, money laundering, insider trading, and conspiracy, among other crimes. Fastow pleaded guilty to two charges of conspiracy and was sentenced to ten years with no parole in a plea bargain to testify against Lay, Skilling, and Causey. Lea was indicted on six felony counts, but prosecutors later dismissed them in favor of a single misdemeanor tax charge. Lea was sentenced to one year for helping her husband hide income from the government.

Lay and Skilling went on trial for their part in the Enron scandal in January 2006. The 53-count, 65-page indictment covered a broad range of financial crimes, including bank fraud, making false statements to banks and auditors, securities fraud, wire fraud, money laundering, conspiracy, and insider trading. United States District Judge Sim Lake had previously denied motions by the defendants to have separate trials and to relocate the case out of Houston, where the defendants argued the negative publicity concerning Enron's demise would make it impossible to get a fair trial. On May 25, 2006, the jury in the Lay and Skilling trial returned its verdicts. Skilling was convicted of 19 of 28 counts of securities fraud and wire fraud and acquitted on the remaining nine, including charges of insider trading. He was sentenced to 24 years and 4 months in prison. In 2013 the United States Department of Justice reached a deal with Skilling, which resulted in ten years being cut from his sentence.

Lay pleaded not guilty to the eleven criminal charges, and claimed that he was misled by those around him. He attributed the main cause for the company's demise to Fastow. Lay was convicted of all six counts of securities and wire fraud for which he had been tried, and he was subject to a maximum total sentence of 45 years in prison. However, before sentencing was scheduled, Lay died on July 5, 2006. At the time of his death, the SEC had been seeking more than $90 million from Lay in addition to civil fines. Linda Lay sold roughly 500,000 shares of Enron ten minutes to thirty minutes before the information that Enron was collapsing went public on November 28, 2001. Linda was never charged with any of the events related to Enron.

Although Michael Kopper worked at Enron for more than seven years, Lay did not know of Kopper even after the company's bankruptcy. Kopper was able to keep his name anonymous in the entire affair. Kopper was the first Enron executive to plead guilty. Rick Causey was indicted with six felony charges for disguising Enron's financial condition during his tenure. After pleading not guilty, he later switched to guilty and was sentenced to seven years in prison.

All told, sixteen people pleaded guilty for crimes committed at the company, and five others, including four former Merrill Lynch employees (three of whose convictions were subsequently overturned on appeal), were found guilty. Eight former Enron executives testified—the main witness being Fastow—against Lay and Skilling, his former bosses. Another was Kenneth Rice, the former chief of Enron Corp.'s high-speed Internet unit, who cooperated and whose testimony helped convict Skilling and Lay. In June 2007, he received a 27-month sentence.

Michael W. Krautz, a former Enron accountant, was among the accused who was acquitted of charges related to the scandal. Represented by Barry Pollack, Krautz was acquitted of federal criminal fraud charges after a month-long jury trial.

=== Arthur Andersen ===
Arthur Andersen was found guilty of obstruction of justice on June 15, 2002 for shredding the thousands of documents and deleting emails and company files that tied the firm to its audit of Enron.

Legal department member Nancy Temple and David Duncan, the lead partner for the Enron account, were cited as the responsible managers in the scandal because they ordered subordinates to shred relevant documents. Duncan himself pleaded guilty in federal court in Houston to obstruction of justice on April 10, 2002, saying that he had ordered the destruction of documents and also personally destroyed documents.

Although only a small number of Arthur Andersen's employees were involved with the scandal, the firm was effectively put out of business; the SEC is not allowed to accept audits from convicted felons. The company surrendered its CPA license on August 31, 2002, and 85,000 employees lost their jobs. The conviction was later overturned by the U.S. Supreme Court due to the jury not being properly instructed on the charge against Andersen. The Supreme Court ruling theoretically left Andersen free to resume operations. However, the damage done to the Andersen name was so great (not just from the Enron scandal but others involving Andersen accounting malpractice such as WorldCom a year after Enron) that it did not return as a viable business even on a limited scale in the years after the ruling.

However, in 2014, Wealth Tax and Advisory Services (WTAS), a tax and consulting firm started by several former Andersen partners, changed its name to Andersen Tax after acquiring the rights to the Andersen name. It also rebranded its year-old international arm from WTAS Global to Andersen Global.

=== NatWest Three ===
Giles Darby, David Bermingham, and Gary Mulgrew worked for Greenwich NatWest. The three British men had worked with Fastow on a special purpose entity he had started called Swap Sub. When Fastow was being investigated by the SEC, the three men met with the British Financial Services Authority (FSA) in November 2001 to discuss their interactions with Fastow. In June 2002, the U.S. issued warrants for their arrest on seven counts of wire fraud, and they were then extradited. On July 12, a potential Enron witness scheduled to be extradited to the U.S., Neil Coulbeck, was found dead in a park in north-east London. Coulbeck's death was eventually ruled to have been a suicide. In a plea bargain in November 2007, the trio pleaded guilty to one count of wire fraud while the other six counts were dismissed. Darby, Bermingham, and Mulgrew were each sentenced to 37 months in prison. In August 2010, Bermingham and Mulgrew retracted their confessions.

== Aftermath ==
=== Employees and shareholders ===
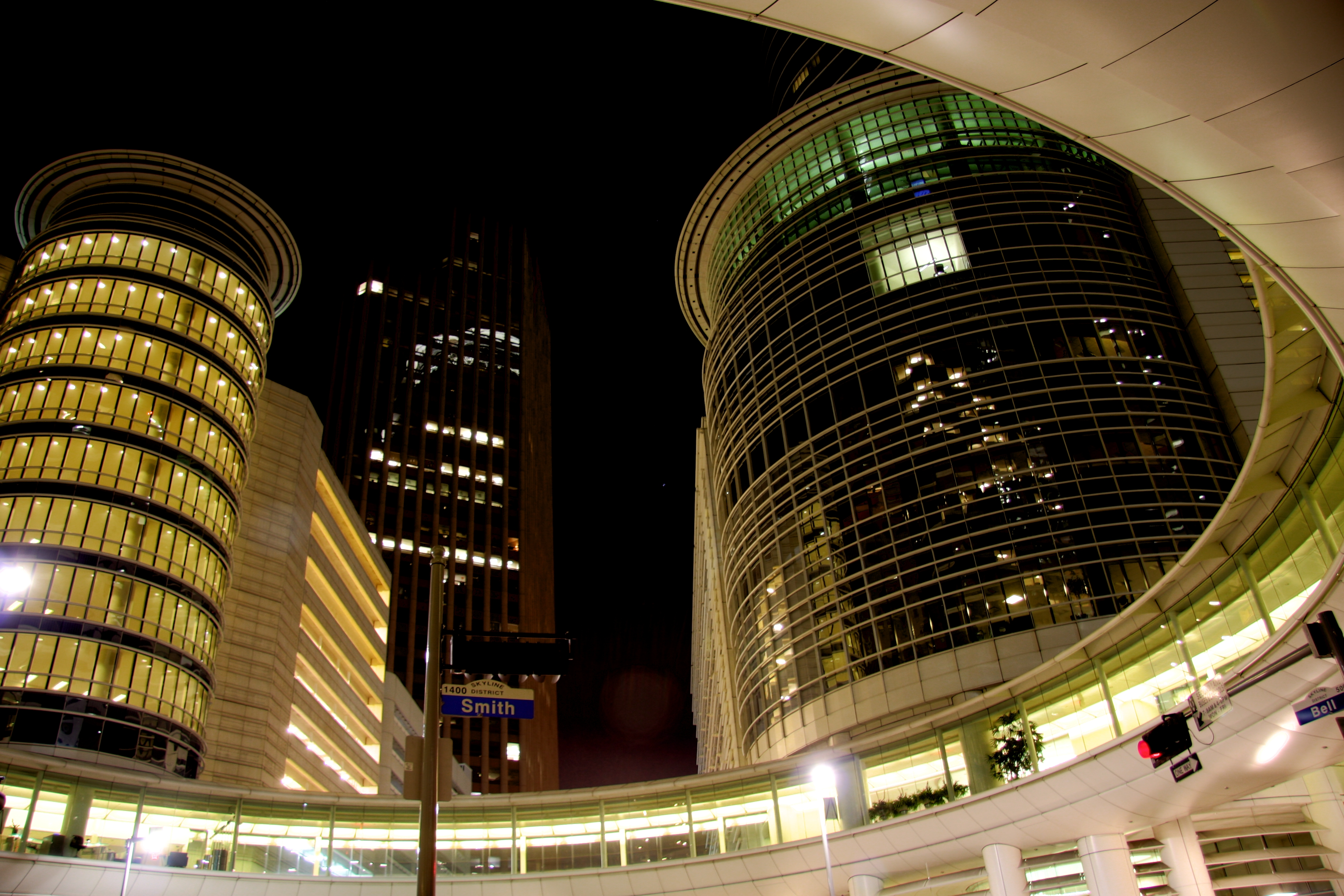
Enron's headquarters in Downtown Houston was leased from a consortium of banks who had bought the property for $285 million in the 1990s. It was sold for $55.5 million, just before Enron moved out in 2004.

While some employees, like John D. Arnold, received large bonuses in the final days of the company, Enron's shareholders lost $74 billion in the four years before the company's bankruptcy ($40 to $45 billion of this was attributed to fraud), and they received little compensation in the aftermath besides severance pay because nearly $67 billion was owed to creditors. To pay its creditors, Enron was legally ordered to sell assets including art, photographs, logo signs, and its pipelines.

A class action lawsuit on behalf of about 20,000 Enron employees who alleged mismanagement of their 401(k) plans resulted in a July 2005 settlement of $356 million against Enron and 401(k) manager Northern Trust. A year later the settlement was reduced to $37.5 million in an agreement by federal judge Melinda Harmon, with Northern Trust neither admitting or denying wrongdoing.

In May 2004, more than 20,000 of Enron's former employees won a suit of $85 million for compensation of $2 billion that was lost from their pensions. From the settlement, the employees each received about $3,100. The next year, investors received another settlement from several banks of $4.2 billion. In September 2008, a $7.2-billion settlement from a $40-billion lawsuit, was reached on behalf of the shareholders. The settlement was distributed among the main plaintiff, University of California (UC), and 1.5 million individuals and groups. UC's law firm Coughlin Stoia Geller Rudman and Robbins, received $688 million in fees, the highest in a U.S. securities fraud case. At the distribution, UC announced in a press release "We are extremely pleased to be returning these funds to the members of the class. Getting here has required a long, challenging effort, but the results for Enron investors are unprecedented."

=== Sarbanes–Oxley Act ===
In the Titanic, the captain went down with the ship. And Enron looks to me like the captain first gave himself and his friends a bonus, then lowered himself and the top folks down the lifeboat and then hollered up and said, "By the way, everything is going to be just fine."

— U.S. Senator Byron Dorgan

Between December 2001 and April 2002, the Senate Committee on Banking, Housing, and Urban Affairs and the House Committee on Financial Services held multiple hearings about the Enron scandal and related accounting and investor protection issues. These hearings and the corporate scandals that followed Enron led to the passage of the Sarbanes-Oxley Act on July 30, 2002. The Act is nearly "a mirror image of Enron: the company's perceived corporate governance failings are matched virtually point for point in the principal provisions of the Act."

The main provisions of the Sarbanes–Oxley Act included the establishment of the Public Company Accounting Oversight Board to develop standards for the preparation of audit reports; the restriction of public accounting companies from providing any non-auditing services when auditing; provisions for the independence of audit committee members, executives being required to sign off on financial reports, and relinquishment of certain executives' bonuses in case of financial restatements; and expanded financial disclosure of companies' relationships with unconsolidated entities.

On February 13, 2002, due to the instances of corporate malfeasances and accounting violations, the SEC recommended changes of the stock exchanges' regulations. In June 2002, the New York Stock Exchange announced a new governance proposal, which was approved by the SEC in November 2003. The main provisions of the final NYSE proposal include:

- All companies must have a majority of independent directors.
- Independent directors must comply with an elaborate definition of independent directors.
- The compensation committee, nominating committee, and audit committee shall consist of independent directors.
- All audit committee members should be financially literate. In addition, at least one member of the audit committee is required to have accounting or related financial management expertise.
- In addition to its regular sessions, the board should hold additional sessions without management.

=== Criticism of the Bush administration ===
Kenneth Lay was a longtime supporter of U.S. president George W. Bush and a donor to his various political campaigns, including his successful bid for the presidency in 2000. As such, critics of Bush and his administration attempted to link them to the scandal. A January 2002 article in The Economist claimed that Lay had been a close personal friend of Bush's family and had backed him financially since his unsuccessful campaign for Congress in 1978. Allegedly, Lay was even rumored at one point to be in the running to serve as Secretary of Energy for Bush.

In an article that same month, Time magazine accused the Bush administration of making desperate attempts to distance themselves from the scandal. According to author Frank Pellegrini, various Bush appointments held connections to Enron, including deputy White House Chief of Staff Karl Rove as a stockholder, Secretary of the Army Thomas E. White Jr. as a former executive, and SEC chairman Harvey Pitt, a former employee of Arthur Andersen. Former Montana governor Marc Racicot, whom Bush considered for appointment for Secretary of the Interior, briefly served as a lobbyist for the company after leaving office. After opening a criminal investigation into the scandal, Attorney General John Ashcroft recused himself and his chief of staff from the case when Democratic Congressman Henry Waxman accused Ashcroft of receiving $25,000 from Enron for his failed reelection campaign to the Senate in 2000. As Pellegrini wrote, "The Democrats will have the company-he-keeps, guilt-by-association thing on their side, and with all the ... general whiff of rich man's cover-up about the whole affair, they'll have a class warfare card to play this spring."

Ken Lay had made phone calls to then-Treasury Secretary Paul H. O'Neill.

== See also ==
- The Crooked E: The Unshredded Truth About Enron – television film about the rise and fall of Enron, based on Anatomy of Greed, a 2002 book by an ex-employee
- Enron: The Smartest Guys in the Room – 2005 documentary based on the eponymous 2003 book about the scandal
- Law & Order: Criminal Intent episode "Tuxedo Hill" – 2002 television episode inspired by the Enron Scandal
- ENRON – 2009 play by British playwright Lucy Prebble about the scandal
- Arthur Andersen LLP v. United States – conviction in United States District Court subsequently overturned by United States Supreme Court
- The Enron Corpus – a database of more than 600,000 emails between Enron executives, made public and used extensively in social networking research
