= Robert Half =

US-based global human resource consulting firm

Robert Half Inc.
- Formerly: Robert Half International Inc.
- Type: Public company
- Traded as: NYSE: RHI; S&P 600 component
- Industry: Employment agency, Professional services
- Founded: March 1948; 78 years ago in New York City
- Founders: Bob and Maxine Half
- Headquarters: Menlo Park, California, U.S.; San Ramon, California, U.S.
- Number of locations: 315 (Robert Half) 89 (Protiviti)
- Area served: Worldwide
- Key people: Harold M. "Max" Messmer (Executive Chairman); M. Keith Waddell (President & CEO)
- Services: Employment agencies, recruitments, human resource consulting and outsourcing
- Revenue: ▼US$5.38 billion (2025)
- Net income: ▼US$133 million (2025)
- Number of employees: approx. 14,700 (including Protiviti) (December 2024)
- Subsidiaries: Protiviti
- Website: www.roberthalf.com

Robert Half Inc. is an international human resource consulting firm founded in 1948, based in Menlo Park and San Ramon, California. It is among the world's largest accounting and finance staffing firms, with over 345 locations worldwide.

Through its Accountemps, Finance & Accounting, and Management Resources divisions, the company provides staff in the fields of accounting and finance. Other divisions include Robert Half Technology, providing software, application, IT infrastructure and operations professionals; Office Team, which specializes in administrative and customer service staffing; The Creative Group, which focuses on design, artistic, and creative talent; and Robert Half Legal, which provides staffing for legal professionals. In 2002, Robert Half founded a subsidiary, Protiviti Inc., a subsidiary, to provide internal audit, financial, operations, technology, governance, and risk consulting services.

== History ==
Robert Half and his wife Maxine, founded the Robert Half Personnel Agency in New York City in 1948. He also created Accountemps, a company founded to supply temporary accountants.

The firm went public in 1987, then expanded its operations into Europe in 1993. In addition to the Accountemps brand, the firm expanded to include specialty groups focusing on technology, legal and creative services personnel. In 1991, the company acquired The Affiliates, renaming it as Robert Half Legal.

Robert Half also provides independent risk consulting, internal audit and information technology consulting services via its Protiviti subsidiary, founded in 2002 with the acquisition of former employees of Arthur Andersen.

In 2003, the company bought back the last of the few remaining independent franchise operations.

In 2006, the company, through its subsidiary Protiviti Inc., acquired the assets of PG Lewis & Associates, a provider of data forensics and cybersecurity services founded in 2003. The financial terms were not disclosed.

In April 2022, Robert Half moved its legal consulting service line to Protiviti, allowing the subsidiary to expand its legal consulting practice.

== See also ==
- Protiviti
- Arthur Andersen
