= Brian Cruver =

American author and businessman

- Occupations: Author; Businessman; Entrepreneur
- Known for: AlertMedia; Anatomy of Greed; The Crooked E: The Unshredded Truth About Enron

Brian Cruver is an American businessman, author, and a former trading-floor Enron employee known for publishing the 2002 novel Anatomy of Greed. The book chronicles a first-hand account of the Enron scandal and was the first non-fiction work published about the company's internal fraud and bankruptcy. In 2003, CBS adapted the book into a television movie, The Crooked E: The Unshredded Truth About Enron. He is also the co-founder of Xenex Disinfection Services and the founder of AlertMedia, and the co-founder of Scorability.

== Career ==
After completing his MBA, Cruver landed a job at Shell in Houston before moving to Enron in 2001. He spent 9 months on the trading floor before witnessing the company's massive collapse and scandal. Cruver and thousands of other employees lost their jobs when Enron filed for bankruptcy. He used his experience to write his novel Anatomy of Greed, which chronicles the collapse from a first-person perspective. The book went on to be a best-seller and in 2003 was adapted as a TV movie for CBS, The Crooked E: The Unshredded Truth About Enron.

In 2009, Cruver co-founded a company called Xenex Disinfection Services, which makes a germ-killing robotic device used by over 500 hospitals globally to reduce hospital-acquired infections. The device uses ultraviolet radiation from a special xenon-filled lightbulb to kill drug-resistant bacteria. In 2013, Cruver founded AlertMedia, an emergency mass notification company. Alertmedia offers threat intelligence, emergency communication, and travel risk management solutions. As of 2025, it serves around 3,500 clients. AlertMedia and Xenex Healthcare are described as “billion-dollar businesses” by CNBC.

Cruver is the CEO and co-founder of Scorability, a startup focused on using advanced technology to improve college sports recruiting. Scorability now boasts 1.2 million athletes and 3,000 college sports program users. In October 2025, the company announced a $40 million funding round led by Bluestone Equity Partners.

== Published books ==
- Anatomy of Greed
