= Arthur E. Andersen =

Accountant firm founder

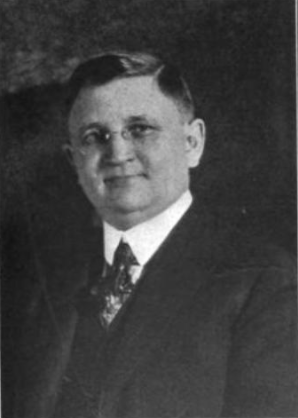
- Andersen in 1920
- Born: Arthur Edward Andersen; May 30, 1885; Plano, Illinois, U.S.
- Died: January 10, 1947 (aged 61); Winnetka, Illinois, U.S.
- Education: Northwestern University
- Scientific career
- Fields: Accounting
- Workplaces: Arthur Andersen

Arthur Edward Andersen (May 30, 1885 – January 10, 1947) was an American accountant who was the founder of the accounting firm Arthur Andersen LLP (now Accenture).

== Biography ==
Arthur Edward Andersen was born in Plano, Illinois, in 1885, to parents Johan Wilhelm (John William) Andersen and Marie (Mary) Kathinka Andersen (née Aabye), who had immigrated to the United States from Drammen, Norway, in 1881; his mother had been born in Thisted, Denmark. Andersen was left on his own at the age of 16 after the death of his parents in 1901. In 1908, after attending courses at night while working full-time, he graduated from the Northwestern University School of Commerce (now the Kellogg School of Management) with a bachelor's degree in business.

He worked during the day as a mailboy and attended school at night. Eventually he was hired as the assistant to the controller of Allis-Chalmers in Chicago, where he became intrigued with the work of independent public accountants. He became a Certified Public Accountant (CPA) in Illinois in 1908, and was then the youngest CPA in the state. In 1913, with Clarence Delaney, he bought out The Audit Company of Illinois to form Andersen, Delaney & Co., which became Arthur Andersen & Co. in 1918.

While practicing accounting, he was also associated with Northwestern University as lecturer (1909–1912), assistant professor (1912–1915), and professor (1915-1922). He also served as head of the accounting department from 1912 to 1922, when he resigned to devote full-time to his professional accounting practice.

Honorary Doctor of Laws degrees were conferred upon him by Luther College in 1938, and by Northwestern University, Grinnell College and St. Olaf College in 1941. Among other awards, in 1940 he was awarded the Norwegian Knight Commander's Cross of the Royal Order of St. Olav. Arthur E. Andersen also served as Treasurer of the Norwegian-American Historical Association (1936–1942) and was a director of the State Bank & Trust Co. (Evanston, Illinois).

At the time of his death, Arthur Andersen was one of the largest accounting firms in the world. Arthur Andersen's mother had schooled him in a Scandinavian axiom – "Think straight, talk straight". His brand of stern independence carried on through Leonard Spacek, who succeeded Andersen after the founder's death in 1947. He was named to the Accounting Hall of Fame in 1953. Northwestern University dedicated Arthur Andersen Hall at the Evanston Campus in 1979 to commemorate Northwestern alumni, faculty member, and trustee Arthur Andersen.

== Selected works ==
- Complete Accounting Course (1917)
- Financial and Industrial Investigations (1924)
- The Major Problem Created by the Machine Age (1931)
- Duties and Responsibilities of the Comptroller (1934)
- The Future of our Economic System (1934)
- Present Day Problems Affecting the Presentation and Interpretation of Financial Statements (1935)
- A Layman Speaks (1941)

== Other sources ==
- Ruane, John A. "Andersen, Arthur E. (1885-1947)." History of Accounting: An International Encyclopedia. (New York: Garland Publishing, Inc. 1996). Pp. 44-45.
- Spacek, Leonard The Growth of Arthur Andersen & Co. 1928-1973, An Oral History (New York: Garland Publishing, Inc. 1989)
- Spacek, Leonard Ahead of His Time, Relevant Today (CPA Journal. March 2004)
