= Richard Gilbert (professor) =

USA economist

Richard J. Gilbert is an American economist. He served as a professor and dean in the economics department at UC Berkeley from 1976 to 2000, and is the founder of LECG Corp. (Law and Economics Consulting Group). Gilbert served as Deputy Assistant General in the Antitrust Division of the U.S. Department of Justice in the White House from 1993 to 1995, as the first of four from the UC Berkeley department of economics.

Gilbert is the author of Innovation Matters: Competition Policy for the Knowledge Economy, published by M.I.T. Press. While serving for the United States Justice Department, he led the development of Joint Department of Justice and Federal Trade Commission Antitrust Guidelines for the Licensing of Intellectual Property. Currently Distinguished Professor Emeritus of Economics at the University of California at Berkeley, Gilbert was president of the Industrial Organization Society during his tenure, and, from 2002 to 2005, the Chair of the economics department there. Gilbert has taken special interest in innovation, organizational behavior, and energy economics. He is the founder of the Gilbert Center - UC Berkeley and works as a consultant for Compass Lexecon and Econic Partners.

== Career ==
Richard Gilbert contributed to the improvement of the Joint Department of Justice and Federal Trade Commission Antitrust, Guidelines for the Licensing of Intellectual Property during the two years, 1993-1995, when he was a Deputy Assistant Attorney General in the Antitrust Division of the U.S. Department. Before becoming a Deputy Assistant Attorney General, Gilbert was the director of the University of California Energy Institute. At the same time, he was an associate editor of several journals, such as The Journal of Economic Theory, The Journal of Industrial Economics, and The Review of Industrial Organization.

== Education ==
B.S. Electrical Engineering at Cornell University 1966 M.S. Electrical Engineering at Cornell University 1967 Ph.D. from Stanford University 1976

Research areas:

- Intellectual Property
- Research and Development
- Energy Markets
- Antitrust Economics

Sabbatical working for the Cambridge University Worked with expert economists in Bergen, Norway.

== Recently published papers ==
- Stepwise Innovation

Stepwise Innovation

- Licensing and Innovation with Imperfect Contract Enforcement

Licensing and Innovation

- Collective Rights Organizations: A Guide to Benefits, Costs and Antitrust Safeguards

Collective Rights Organizations: A Guide to Benefits, Costs and Antitrust Safeguards
