= LECG Corporation =

Former U.S. consulting firm

- Industry: Consulting
- Founded: 1988
- Founder: David Teece
- Headquarters: Emeryville, California, United States
- Revenue: $313.3 million (2010)
- Website: www.lecg.com

LECG Corporation was an American consulting company based in Emeryville, California. It provided independent expert testimony on behalf of corporations, produced authoritative studies for industry, conducted economic and financial analyses on disputes and issues, and provided strategic advisory and financial advisory services to clients. In March 2011, the company was liquidated as it was unable to service its debt obligations.

== History ==
In 1988, Richard Gilbert, while on faculty from the University of California at Berkeley formed The Law and Economics Consulting Group, Inc. Its original services included independent expert testimony, authoritative studies and advisory services for regulatory, business and judicial clients.

The firm was renamed to LECG in October 1997 and shortly thereafter it went public through an IPO on the NYSE. Navigant Consulting, Inc. (NYSE: NCI) (then The Metzler Group, Inc.) purchased LECG in a deal valued at $214 million.

In October 2000 the private equity fund Thoma Cressey Equity Partners and the management team of LECG announced the acquisition of assets from Navigant Consulting. At the time, the firm had more than 300 employees and focused on antitrust, deregulation, damage analysis, economic and financial modeling, and intellectual property rights.

In 2003 the firm went public again, this time on the NASDAQ. The firm made acquisitions to expand its geographic footprint and expand its lines of business including: Economic Analysis LLC, Low Rosen Taylor Soriano, Silicon Valley Expert Witness Group, Washington Advisory Group, LLC, Beach & Company International LP, Lancaster Consulting, LLC, BMB Mack Barclay, Inc, The Secura Group LLC

On August 18, 2009 LECG announced a merger with SMART Business Advisory & Consulting, LLC, a privately held provider of business advisory services. LECG received a $125 million cash investment from SMART's majority shareholder, Great Hill Partners in exchange for approximately 10.9 million shares of common stock and 6.3 million shares of preferred stock in the combined company. On July 1, 2010, Yuri Rozenfeld assumed the role of General Counsel and Corporate Secretary, replacing Deanne Tully. On August 15, 2010, Warren Barratt assumed the role of Chief Financial Officer, replacing Steve Fife. The firm closed its Emeryville, California office and relocated its back-office to SMART's headquarters in Devon, Pennsylvania. In July 2010, LECG completed its first transaction since completing the merger with SMART, when it acquired Bourne, a UK Tax consultancy.

Continued losses, weak demand, high administration costs, and consultant departures, resulted in the forced liquidation of the merged entity in order to satisfy interest and principal obligations due March 31, 2011. On April 5, 2011, Steve Samek announced his resignation along with that of CFO Warren D. Barratt. LECG was delisted from the NASDAQ on April 21, 2011, and has employed the Staten Group, a liquidation firm, to help dissolve its business.
