= West Monroe Partners =

American digital services firm

West Monroe, LLC
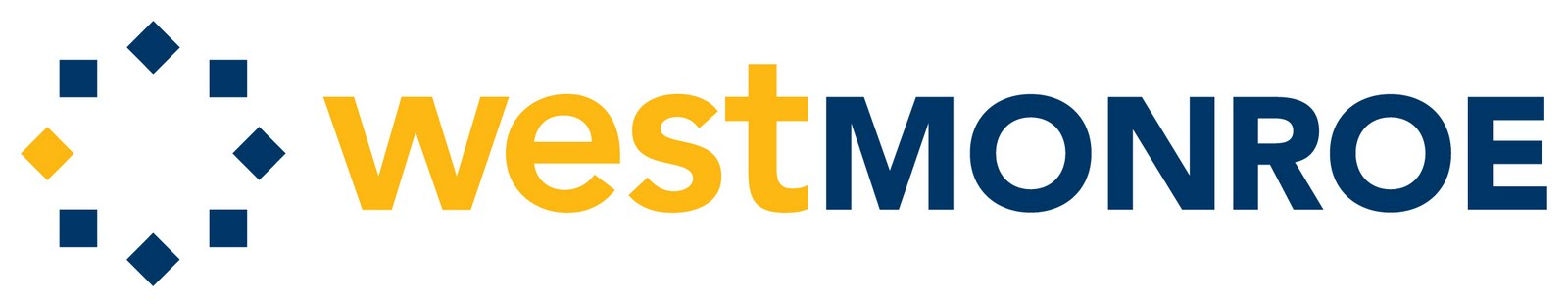
- Type: Private
- Industry: Management consulting Banking; Credit Unions; Capital Markets; Private equity Insurance; Healthcare; Life Sciences; Energy; Utilities; Manufacturing; Distribution; Retail; Technology
- Founded: 2002
- Headquarters: Chicago, Illinois
- Area served: North America; Europe
- Key people: Kevin McCarty (CEO)
- Number of employees: 1745
- Website: westmonroe.com

West Monroe is a digital services firm headquartered in Chicago, Illinois. West Monroe provides traditional management consulting, creative and product engineering services to businesses across many industries, including consumer and industrial products, energy and utilities, financial services, healthcare, life sciences, private equity, retail, and software and high tech. West Monroe is consistently recognized as a best place to work and a top consulting firm. West Monroe’s tagline is "Don’t Do Digital. Be Digital."

== Office locations ==
West Monroe has ten offices and talent hubs, including Chicago (headquarters), Dallas, Los Angeles, Minneapolis, New York City, San Francisco, Seattle, Washington, D.C., London, and Costa Rica.

== History and acquisitions ==
=== 2002–2004: formative years ===
In April 2002, four former Arthur Andersen consultants met at Miller’s Pub in Chicago and founded West Monroe. That group, which did include Dean Fischer (chairman of the board emeritus) and Kevin McCarty (currently CEO and chairman of the board), established West Monroe Partners LLC, with the name deriving from Arthur Andersen's previous address on West Monroe Street in Chicago.

In 2004, West Monroe created the Chiefs program to foster a culture specific to the interests of their employees.

The firm began serving its first client, Equity Marketing Services, in June 2002, and went on to deliver business and technology consulting services to a variety of mostly Midwestern clients from its Chicago office.

=== 2005–2009: expansion years ===
The years between 2005 and 2009 marked a period of expansion for West Monroe. In 2005, the firm opened new offices in Seattle and New York. The firm reached $10 million in revenue and hired its 100th employee, including members of West Monroe's first university recruiting class.

=== 2010–2017: continued expansion ===
In April 2012, West Monroe celebrated its tenth anniversary in business.

At the end of 2012, West Monroe reorganized as an employee stock ownership plan.

In 2013, West Monroe establishes the Fischer Fellowship Program, allowing employees to apply for consideration to pursue philanthropic and humanitarian interests with a three to six-month compensated leave. Today, 29 employees have participated in the Fischer Fellowship spanning 18 countries and helping 27 organizations.

West Monroe also made its first acquisition in 2013, acquiring the Minneapolis-based On Point Consulting, a merger integration solutions specialist, which establishes the Minneapolis office based in the Twin Cities.

In January 2014, West Monroe announced it had acquired Madrona Solutions Group, a Seattle-based consulting firm focused on delivering customer relationship management and business intelligence. The same month it also announced the opening of its Los Angeles, CA office.

In October 2014, president and co-founder Kevin McCarty was named as CEO.

In October 2015, West Monroe announced it had acquired Etherios, a Salesforce platform. As part of the acquisition, the firm strengthened its presence in two markets, San Francisco, CA and Dallas, TX.

In July 2016, West Monroe announced it had acquired Invoyent, a Chicago-based healthcare consulting firm, expanding the firm’s healthcare practice.

=== 2017-2021: recent history ===
In 2017, West Monroe announced the acquisition of CAST Management Consultants, a financial services consulting firm based in Los Angeles. In the fall of 2018, West Monroe met new headcount milestones, exceeding 1,000 employees and reaching $1 billion in cumulative revenue. In 2019, West Monroe acquired two companies: Waterstone Management Group, an advisory firm for private equity firms and Fortune 500 companies to expand and deepen West Monroe’s strategic advisory and operations improvement services; and GoKart Labs, a digital product studio establishing a more comprehensive set of digital offerings for clients.

In October 2019, West Monroe signed a lease for their new HQ as the anchor tenant at 311 W. Monroe in Chicago’s Loop neighborhood.

In 2020, West Monroe acquired Pace Harmon, a strategy and outsourcing firm, adding depth in transformation advisory services. This acquisition establishes West Monroe’s Washington D.C. office and footprint. West Monroe also acquired Two Six Capital, a data science firm for private equity, strengthening West Monroe’s position as a market leader in private equity advisory.

=== 2021-present ===
In September 2021, West Monroe acquired Verys, a California-based software development firm and Carbon Five, a product management, digital design, and software engineering firm.

In October 2021, West Monroe received an investment from MSD Partners, L.P. a leading investment advisor founded in 2009 by the partners of MSD Capital, the family investment office for Michael Dell, Founder & CEO of Dell Technologies. This investment supports West Monroe’s strategy to establish itself as the leading digital consulting firm in North America and to expand internationally.

In 2022, West Monroe announced its multi-year expansion in Western Europe by opening its London office to serve its private equity clients. The same year, West Monroe acquired 71 & Change, change management consultancy based in the Pacific Northwest, expanding West Monroe’s organizational change management services. Nielson HR executive Laurie Lovett was also named to West Monroe’s Board of Directors.

In 2023, TED CEO Jay Herratti joined West Monroe’s Board of Directors.

== Industry and services specialization ==
West Monroe maintains specialized capabilities in the following industries and services:

Industries

- Financial services
- Private equity
- Healthcare & Life Sciences
- Energy and Utilities
- Consumer & Industrial Products
- Retail
- Software and High Tech

Services

- Customer Engagement
- Mergers & Acquisitions
- Data & Technology
- Organization & People
- Business Operations
- Products & Experiences

== Awards and recognition ==
West Monroe is consistently named as a best place to work by publications such as Great Place to Work and Fortune Magazine, Consulting Magazine, Crain’s Chicago Business, Chicago Tribune, Crain’s New York, Dallas Business Journal, LA Business Journal, and Built In. In 2018, West Monroe’s CEO Kevin McCarty was named Entrepreneur of the Year by EY. West Monroe’s leaders are also recognized by other leading publications such as Consulting Magazine, M&A Advisor, Built In, and Crain’s New York.

== Publishing ==
West Monroe publishes a monthly newsletter for clients, as well as several industry-specific newsletters. These ongoing newsletters highlight key industry trends and issues facing C-level executives.

In 2022, West Monroe launched its podcast, This is Digital, to demystify digital transformation by showing what digital looks like “in real life” through interviews with in-house experts, influencers, and executives. Guests include Mark King, CEO of Taco Bell; Rob Wescott, Renowned Clinton Admin Economist; Allie K. Miller, AI Entrepreneur.

In addition, West Monroe authors multiple research studies and polls, white papers, thought leadership, blog posts, executive communications, and newsletters on what it means to be digital.
