= Andersen Tax =

Tax firm in USA

Andersen Tax LLC
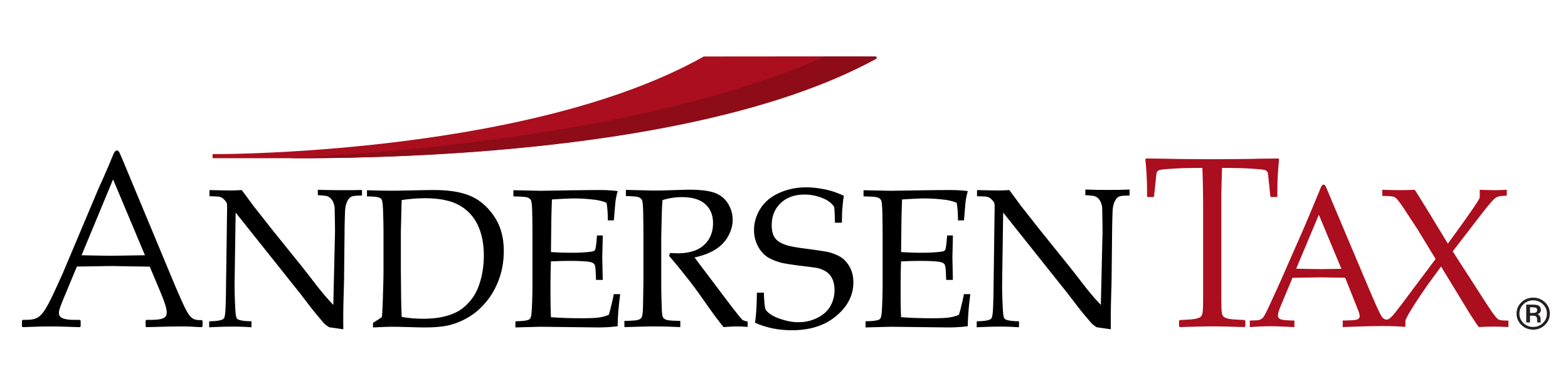
- Formerly: Wealth and Tax Advisory Services (2002-2014)
- Type: Limited Liability Company
- Industry: Professional Services
- Founded: 2002
- Headquarters: San Francisco, CA,
- Number of locations: 25 U.S. Offices
- Key people: Mark Vorsatz, CEO
- Services: Tax; Consulting; Valuation; Financial Advisory; Wealth Management
- Number of employees: 1900
- Subsidiaries: Andersen Global
- Website: andersen.com

Andersen Tax LLC is a service firm headquartered in San Francisco, California, United States. It provides tax, valuation, financial advisory and consulting services to individuals and corporate clients. As of 2015, Andersen Global had a presence in 179 countries.

== History ==
Andersen Tax was established as Wealth and Tax Advisory Services in July 2002. In the wake of Arthur Andersen's demise, several former partners of Arthur Andersen formed Wealth and Tax Advisory Services USA Inc. (WTAS), a subsidiary of HSBC USA, Inc, to handle a portion of Arthur Andersen's tax practice.

On December 31, 2007, HSBC USA Inc. sold Wealth & Tax Advisory Services USA Inc. (‘WTAS’) to participating WTAS managing directors in a management buyout (MBO) resulting in WTAS LLC. In consideration for the sale, HSBC received US$5 million in cash and deferred notes with a principal amount totaling US$60.85 million.

By November, WTAS Global had acquired the Paris-based law firm STC Partners.

On September 2, 2014, WTAS LLC changed its name to Andersen Tax LLC and WTAS Global changed its name to Andersen Global.

In June 2015 Andersen Global launched in Latin America with the addition of Mexican firms, NOVINT, Capin, Ibañez & Asociados and Montes, Hernández, López y Del Castillo. Shortly thereafter a Guatemala opened via the addition of Trust Consulting in Guatemala City.

By the end of 2015 Andersen Global had presence in Spain and Brazil. Andersen Global now has 45 international locations with over 1,200 professionals worldwide.

On March 1, 2017, Andersen Tax & Legal made its debut in Spain, absorbing Global Abogados, the first in Europe to adopt the Andersen name.

In 2018 Andersen debuted in Ireland, Egypt, France, Ecuador and Kenya along with notable expansion in Spain, Portugal, Mexico, UK, Luxembourg, Canada and Brazil. The association added a presence in Argentina, Kuwait, Mozambique, Angola, Hungary, Jordan, and India.

On September 3, 2019, Andersen Tax rebranded to Andersen.

In October 2019, Andersen Global announced Nangia Andersen India as its Indian member firm. Nangia Andersen India is global network's 1st Indian Firm.

== Andersen Global ==
Andersen Global is an association of legally separate, independent member firms providing services under the brand Andersen, Andersen Tax, Andersen Tax & Legal or Andersen Legal.

In July 2013, WTAS Global was founded by U.S. member firm WTAS LLC, a wealth and tax advisory firm that had been founded in 2002 by 23 former Arthur Andersen partners. In 2014, WTAS LLC changed its name to Andersen Tax, and WTAS Global changed its name to Andersen Global.

In 2018, Andersen Global announced several locations adopting the Andersen name, such as in Canada and Uruguay.

In Fall 2019, Andersen Tax changed its brand name to Andersen.

In October 2019, Andersen Global announces Nangia Andersen India as its Indian Member Firm. Nangia Andersen India is global network's 1st Indian Firm of Andersen Global.

By the Fall of 2023, Andersen Global had grown to a headcount of roughly 14,000 professionals in more than 400 locations (22 in the United States).

In 2022, In interview with Hindu Business Line, Mark L Vorsatz, Global Chairman, Andersen Global along with Rakesh Nangia, Chairman, Nangia Andersen India expresses high optimism for the Indian economy

Mark L Vorsatz, Global Chairman, Andersen Global and Rakesh Nangia, Chairman, Nangia Andersen India share their future expansion plans in an exclusive interview with Mint
