= Accuracy (company) =

French consultancy firm

Accuracy is an independent, global consultancy firm headquartered in Paris, France. The firm has offices in 17 locations worldwide. The firm provides advice to corporates and investors on acquisitions, disposals, disputes, restructuring and major decisions.

== History ==
Accuracy was founded in 2004 by a team of seven former consultants of consulting firm Arthur Andersen, including Frédéric Duponchel, who has been serving as Accuracy’s CEO and Managing Partner since its foundation. The firm now has 80 partners, employs 750 staff worldwide and recorded revenues of €125 million in 2021.

== Operations ==
Accuracy operates in four situations:

1. Transactions – valuations, project advisory and post M&A advisory
2. Disputes – litigation & arbitration,
3. Crises - Recovery, investigations, forensics and project disputes
4. Strategy & Business performance – strategic & financial planning, group & portfolio strategy, business model innovation, smart reporting and transformation

Accuracy’s model excludes all regulated accounting and financial activities, such as statutory audits. The firm is focused on independence and removing conflicts of interest. Accuracy states that it will never work for more than one party on a particular matter. For example, it is relatively common for a consultancy firm to provide advice to more than one potential bidder for an asset, which can be regarded as a conflict of interest.

== Locations ==
Accuracy now has office in 17 locations worldwide:

- EMEA: Paris, London, Frankfurt, Amsterdam, Munich, Luxembourg, Madrid, Barcelona, Milan, Dubai, Casablanca
- North America: Toronto, Montreal, New York City, New Orleans, Dallas, Las Vegas
- APAC: Singapore, Hong Kong, Beijing, New Delhi
