= SMART Business Advisory and Consulting =

SMART Business Advisory and Consulting, LLC
- Type: Consulting
- Industry: Professional Services
- Founded: 1988
- Headquarters: Devon, PA, USA
- Number of locations: 14, Worldwide
- Area served: Worldwide
- Key people: Steve Samek, CEO
- Services: Accounting, Audit, Attest, Actuarial, Business Advisory, Consulting, Compensation and Benefits, Tax, Transaction Advisory
- Number of employees: 500
- Website: SMART Business Advisory and Consulting, LLC

SMART Business Advisory and Consulting, LLC was a consulting company that served clients throughout the U.S. and globally. SMART was headquartered in Devon, Pennsylvania with locations in the metropolitan areas of Atlanta, Chicago, New York City, Philadelphia, and internationally in London. The merged entity of LECG/SMART was liquidated in March 2011 as the company was unable to service its debt obligations going forward.

== History ==
SMART was founded in 1988 by James J. Smart, primarily as a tax and audit firm. SMART grew rapidly growing to one of the 20 largest accounting and consulting firms in the U.S. From 1998 to 2007 under Mr. Smart's leadership, the company enjoyed a compound annual growth rate of 40%. In 2002 with the hire of disenfranchised Arthur Andersen personnel, SMART offerings broadened to include business advisory and consulting services. In 2007, Mr. Smart led a recapitalization and sale to Great Hill Partners, a Private Equity group. Great Hill Partners' model, predicated on leveraged financing ultimately led to the need for further restructuring. With the economic downturn in 2008 and a heavy debt load, the company struggled with repeat turnover of CFOs, and the dismissal of the founder and CEO. On August 17, 2009, LECG Corporation announced that it has entered into definitive agreements to merge with SMART.

Major developments include:

- May 1993: First major tax outsourcing engagement
- November 1996: John Swanick joins from Deloitte and Touche to lead the Insurance practice.
- June 1997: First major consulting engagement
- October 2001: Opened Chicago office
- July 2002: After the conviction of Arthur Andersen LLP in June 2002 and the swift loss of partners' equity capital, 55 Andersen consultants led by six former partners (Joe Lanzisera, Stan Pittman, Jonathan Stomberger, Kathy Bellwoar, Bob Baxter and Neil Schneider) join SMART and Associates to drive the firm's Business Consulting practice.
- September 2002: Opened New York office
- October 2002: Purchased Glenn Ingram Chicago (22 people). Company reports $25.5 million in annual revenues.
- March 2003: Purchased Strategis: Schaumburg, Philadelphia & Atlanta (21 people)
- May 2003: Purchased Grabush, Newman & Co. Baltimore (50 people). SMART employs roughly 300 people and with the Grabash Newman acquisition annual revenues approach $40 million.
- 2005: Opened Amsterdam office
- February 2006: Purchased KPMG Compensation & Benefits Practice
- September 2006: Opened London office
- May 2007: Great Hill Partners, LLC acquires a controlling interest in SMART for $60 million and by refinancing $60 million of debt and other liabilities. CEO James Smart indicated the deal was sought to address the problem that "we're thinly capitalized, have been from day one". The deal leaves Smart and 62 other partners in SMART Business Advisory with a significant minority stake. Smart would not say how much of the $60 million went to the partners. SEC proxy statement details the recapitalization consisting of $118,634,000 aggregate purchase price with nearly the entire Great Hill cash investment provided to SMART principals in exchange for 80% voting interest.
- March 2008: Terence Montgomery hired as CFO replacing Richard Devine.
- June 2008: Grabush, Newman & Co. staff released.
- August 2008: In August the firm reports that founder James Smart has stepped down from the position of CEO, and retained as chairman to focus on long-term strategy. In December it is confirmed that Smart was forced out by Great Hill Partners, the private equity firm that bought 80% of the firm in May 2007.
- November 2008: Steve Samek, former head of Arthur Andersen's U.S. operations, is hired as CEO.
- December 2008: Terence Montgomery resigns as CFO after brief tenure. In calendar year 2008, SMART is one of the very few large national consulting firms to experience both a decrease in revenues and subsequent employee headcount. Revenues contracted by 10% while nationwide the industry growth rate expanded at 9%.
- August 2009: Howard Stecker resigns as CFO
- August 2009: LECG announces proposed merger with SMART. LECG is to receive a $25 million cash investment from SMART's majority shareholder, Great Hill Partners in exchange for approximately 10.9 million shares of common stock and 6.3 million shares of preferred stock in the combined company. LECG will assume approximately $32.4 million of SMART net debt. The debt was incurred as part of the May 2007 Great Hill recapitalization effort wherein aggregate purchase price was supplemented with a term loan negotiated by Great Hill, on behalf of SMART, with a senior secured credit facility of $45 million.
- March 31, 2011: The term loan with termination date of March 31, 2011 ultimately proved to be the company's death knell. Continued losses, weak demand, high administration costs and consultant departures, resulted in the forced liquidation of the merged entity so as to satisfy unpaid principal and interest. Practices were sold off rapidly to meet the March 31 deadline, with the company announcing there would be no proceeds for common stockholders as it winds-down its business.
- April 5, 2011: Steve Samek announced his resignation on April 5, 2011, along with that of CFO Warren D. Barratt.

== Notable Staff ==
- Steve Samek
- Joseph L. Lanzisera
- Jim Perry
