= Protiviti =

Consulting firm

Protiviti Inc.
- Type: Subsidiary
- Industry: Professional services
- Founded: 2002; 24 years ago
- Headquarters: Menlo Park and San Ramon, CA, United States
- Number of locations: 89 offices (2024)
- Area served: Worldwide
- Key people: Joseph Tarantino (President & CEO)
- Services: Consulting; Internal Audit; IT Consulting; Risk Advisory; Financial Advisory; Legal Advisory
- Revenue: ▲USD 1.95 billion (2024)
- Operating income: ▼USD 160.20 million (2024)
- Number of employees: ▲7,100 (2024)
- Parent: Robert Half
- Website: https://www.protiviti.com/

Protiviti Inc. (Protiviti) is a global consulting firm headquartered in Menlo Park and San Ramon, California, that provides consulting in internal audit, risk and compliance, technology, business processes, data analytics and finance. It is a subsidiary under Robert Half. Protiviti and its independently and locally owned Member Firms serve clients through a network of more than 89 locations in over 29 countries.

Protiviti has served more than 80 percent of Fortune 100, nearly 80 percent of Fortune 500 and 70 percent of Fortune 1000 companies. From 2018 to 2025, the firm has been consistently listed by Forbes⁣ as being one of the world's best management consulting firms. Protiviti has also been listed as one of the 100 Best Companies to Work For by Fortune Magazine for 11 consecutive years from 2015 to 2025.

== History ==
Protiviti was formed in 2002 when the Company hired more than 700 professionals who had been affiliated with the internal audit, business and technology risk consulting practice of Arthur Andersen, including more than 50 individuals who had been partners of that firm. These professionals formed the base of Protiviti.

In 2006, Protiviti acquired the assets of PG Lewis & Associates, a leading national provider of Data Forensics and Cybersecurity services founded in 2003 by serial technology entrepreneur, Paul G. Lewis. Financial terms were not disclosed.

The following year Protiviti acquired the bankruptcy consulting firm PENTA Advisory Services, LLC with locations in Baltimore, Maryland and Richmond, Virginia. PENTA provided restructuring and insolvency services, litigation services and US bankruptcy trustee services. Financial details regarding the transaction were not disclosed.

In 2015, Protiviti acquired Decision First Technologies.

In January 2019, Protiviti expanded its Middle East & North African presence by launching an office in Cairo, Egypt. The new location is the first Member Firm in North Africa, and is led by Managing Director Ashraf Fahmy, a former Deloitte partner in Egypt and with the firm's enterprise risk practice in Abu Dhabi.

In February 2019, Protiviti added Gauteng-based internal audit and forensic services firm SekelaXabiso CA (SkX) as its first member firm in South Africa. The new firm will serve domestic firms as well as international firms looking for support to enter the South African market. The firm houses over 200 consultants, and has offices in the major financial centres of Gauteng and Durban.

For fiscal year 2019, Protiviti's revenue exceeded US$1 billion for the first time in its 18-year history.

In March 2020, Protiviti expanded its European footprint by opening 3 new offices in Zürich, Switzerland, and Berlin and Düsseldorf, Germany. Protiviti's global network of member firms operate as independently owned and operated entities, but have access to the firm's resources despite not possessing agency to act on Protiviti's behalf.

== Service Expansion ==
In March 2022, Protiviti formed a new service line, "Protiviti Digital", which serves as a digital marketing agency. Protiviti Digital serves clients seeking to execute complex digital and marketing strategies, as well as transform customer experiences.

In April 2022, Robert Half moved its legal consulting service line to Protiviti, which allows Protiviti to expand its legal consulting practice. The service line supports clients with a broader range of legal, compliance, governance, technology, investigation and transaction-related business needs.

== See also ==
- List of management consulting firms
- List of IT consulting firms
- Robert Half
- Arthur Andersen
