= Enron Code of Ethics =

Booklet published by Enron Corporation

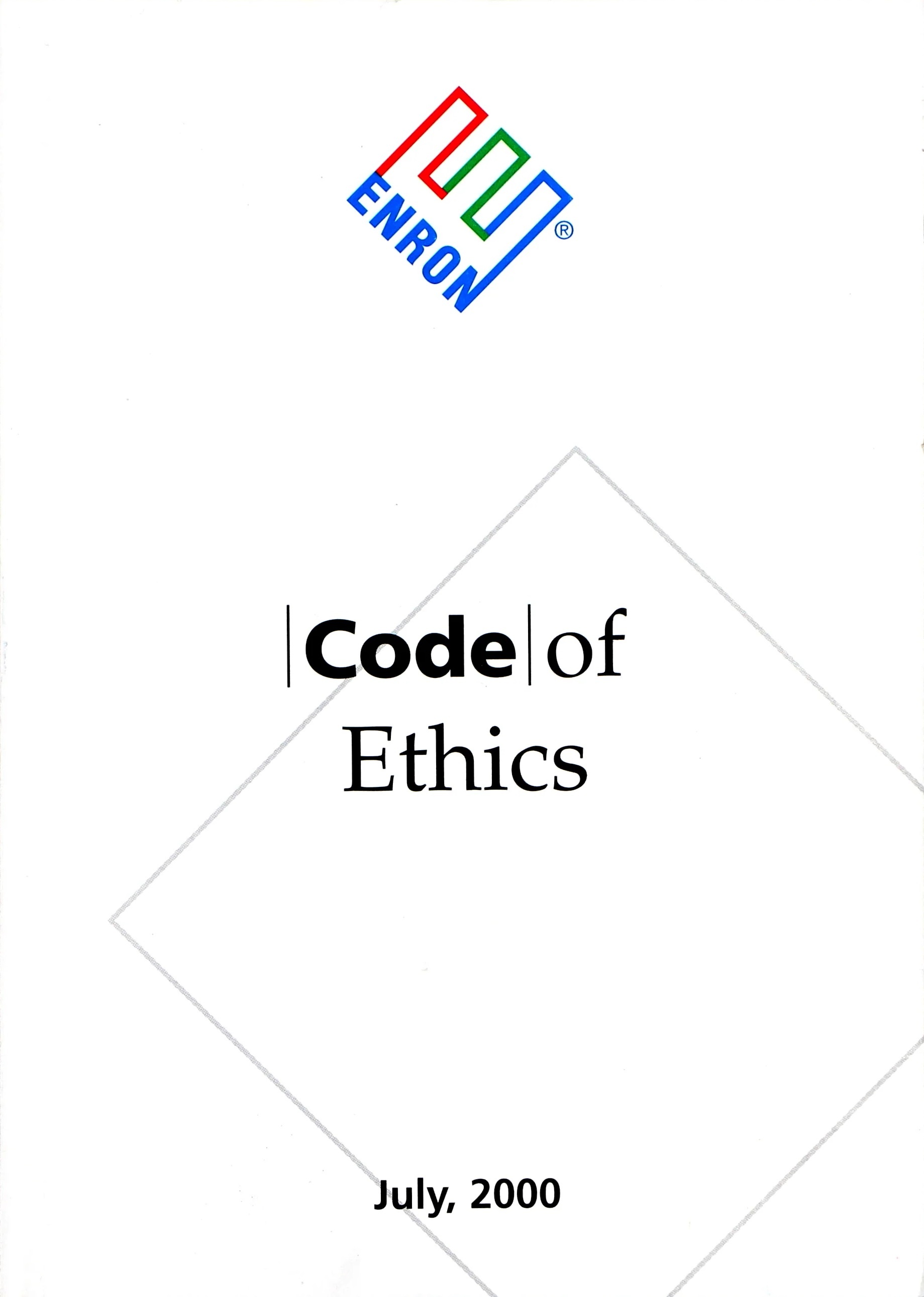
- Last known edition cover (July, 2000)
- Author: Kenneth Lee Lay
- Language: English
- Subject: Ethical code
- Genre: Handbook
- Published: 2000 (Enron)
- Publisher: Enron
- Publication date: 1 July 2000
- Publication place: United States
- Media type: Book
- Pages: 64

The Enron Code of Ethics is a 64-page booklet that was published by Enron Corporation, the last known edition of which was in 1 July 2000.
