= David Duncan (accountant) =

American accountant (born 1960)

David B. Duncan (born 1960) is a former partner of Arthur Andersen, and was the United States government's star witness in the Arthur Andersen trial. He has said fears over interpretation prompted him to order the shredding of documents relating to Enron.

Duncan grew up in Odessa, Texas, and graduated from Texas A&M University in 1980 with a degree in accounting. He began working at Arthur Andersen's Houston office in 1981 and become a partner at the firm in 1995. In 1997, he was assigned as the lead partner on the Enron account and was paid over $1 million for his work. During this time, Duncan became a member of the 18-partner Andersen CEO Advisory Council and Andersen's representative on the 36-member American Council for Capital Formation.

He was fired from Andersen in January 2002 and charged with obstruction of justice for ordering Andersen staff to shred over a ton of papers related to Enron. On April 9, 2002, he pleaded guilty; the maximum sentence for his crimes is ten years, but since he pleaded guilty and became a witness for the prosecution he would have presumably received a much smaller sentence. His sentencing date was postponed numerous times. He withdrew his guilty plea on December 12, 2005, after the overturning of the Arthur Andersen conviction. This was approved by U.S. District Judge Melinda Harmon. In January 2008 he settled charges with the SEC that he violated securities laws. In November 2011, The Houston Chronicle/Fuelfix reported that Duncan was Vice President and Chief Financial Officer of Houston-based U.S. Pipeline.
