= Arthur Andersen LLP v. United States =

- Supreme Court of the United States

Argued April 27, 2005 Decided May 31, 2005
- Full case name: Arthur Andersen LLP v. United States
- Citations: 544 U.S. 696 (more) 125 S.Ct. 2129; 161 L. Ed. 2d 1008; 2005 U.S. LEXIS 4348; 73 U.S.L.W. 4393; Fed. Sec. L. Rep. (CCH) ¶ 93,266; 18 Fla. L. Weekly Fed. S 324

Case history
- Prior: Charges filed against Arthur Andersen LLP in the United States District Court for the Southern District of Texas on May 6, 2002.; Guilty verdict, June 15, 2002.; Conviction affirmed, 374 F.3d 281 (5th Cir. 2004); Certiorari granted, 543 U.S. 1042 (2005)

Holding
- The jury instructions failed to convey properly the elements of a "corrup[t] persuas[ion]" conviction under §1512(b).

Court membership
- Chief Justice William Rehnquist Associate Justices John P. Stevens · Sandra Day O'Connor; Antonin Scalia · Anthony Kennedy; David Souter · Clarence Thomas; Ruth Bader Ginsburg · Stephen Breyer

Case opinion
- Majority: Rehnquist, joined by unanimous

Laws applied
- 18 U.S.C. § 1512(b) (2000)

Arthur Andersen LLP v. United States, 544 U.S. 696 (2005), was a United States Supreme Court case in which the Court unanimously overturned accounting firm Arthur Andersen's conviction of obstruction of justice in the fraudulent activities and subsequent collapse of Enron. The Court found that the jury instructions did not properly portray the law Arthur Andersen was charged with breaking. Even after the conviction was overturned, the damage to Arthur Andersen's reputation was such that it did not return as a viable business.

== Background ==
During the fall of Enron, Arthur Andersen, Enron's accounting firm, instructed its employees to destroy documents relating to Enron after Andersen officials learned they would soon be investigated by the Securities and Exchange Commission. On March 6, 2002, a charge of obstructing an official proceeding of the Securities and Exchange Commission was filed against Arthur Andersen LLP in the United States District Court for the Southern District of Texas. The indictment was served by Michael Chertoff, who was subsequently appointed Secretary of Homeland Security by President George W. Bush. The jury found Arthur Andersen guilty on June 15. Since federal regulations do not allow convicted felons to audit public companies, Andersen surrendered its CPA license on August 31, effectively putting the firm out of business in the United States.

Andersen appealed to the United States Court of Appeals for the Fifth Circuit. The Fifth Circuit affirmed the district court's decision. Andersen petitioned for a writ of certiorari to the Supreme Court, which was granted.

The issue was whether the jury had been properly communicated the law which Andersen was charged with violating. They were charged under 18 U.S.C. § 1512(b)(2)(A) and (B), which made it a crime to "knowingly ... corruptly persuad[e] another person ... with intent to ... cause" that person to "withhold" documents from, or "alter" documents for use in, an "official proceeding". Arthur Andersen believed the instructions given to the jury were not proper. The jury was reportedly told "even if petitioner honestly and sincerely believed its conduct was lawful, the jury could convict". This is not true, held the Supreme Court. The statute they were being charged under used the language "knowingly ... corruptly persuade". Arthur Andersen managers did instruct their employees to delete Enron-related files, but those actions were within their document retention policy. If the document retention policy was constructed to keep certain information private, even from the government, Arthur Andersen was still not corruptly persuading their employees to keep said information private.

== Opinion of the Court ==
In a unanimous decision by the Supreme Court, Arthur Andersen's conviction was overturned. Chief Justice William Rehnquist wrote the opinion for the court, and was joined by all associate justices.

In the court's view, the instructions allowed the jury to convict Andersen without proving that the firm knew it had broken the law or that there had been a link to any official proceeding that prohibited the destruction of documents. The instructions were so vague that they "simply failed to convey the requisite consciousness of wrongdoing", Rehnquist wrote. "Indeed, it is striking how little culpability the instructions required." Rehnquist's opinion also expressed grave skepticism at the government's definition of "corrupt persuasion" – persuasion with an improper purpose even without knowing an act is unlawful. "Only persons conscious of wrongdoing can be said to 'knowingly corruptly persuade'", he wrote.
