= Arthur Andersen =

1913–2002 American accounting firm

Arthur Andersen & Co.
- Type: Private
- Industry: Accounting; Auditing; Consulting; Professional services; Tax advising
- Founded: 1913; 113 years ago
- Founder: Arthur E. Andersen
- Defunct: August 31, 2002 (CPA licenses surrendered)
- Fate: Dissolved after the Enron scandal
- Successor: Accenture; Protiviti; Andersen Tax
- Headquarters: Chicago, Illinois, U.S.
- Revenue: US$9.3 billion (2002)
- Number of employees: 28,000 (2002)
- Website: andersen.com at the Wayback Machine (archived 2001-06-10)

Arthur Andersen LLP was an American accounting firm based in Chicago that provided auditing, tax advising, consulting and other professional services to large corporations. By 2001, it had become one of the world's largest multinational corporations and was one of the "Big Five" accounting firms (along with Deloitte, Ernst & Young, KPMG and PricewaterhouseCoopers). The firm collapsed by mid-2002, as details of its questionable accounting practices for energy company Enron and telecommunications company WorldCom were revealed amid the two high-profile bankruptcies. The scandals were a factor in the enactment of the Sarbanes–Oxley Act of 2002.

== History ==
=== Founding ===
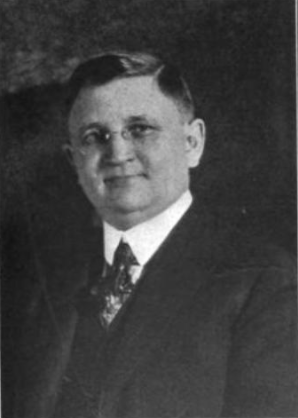
Arthur E. Andersen

Revenue per year in million U.S. dollars. Source: corporate press releases

Born on May 30, 1885, in Plano, Illinois, and orphaned at the age of 16, Arthur E. Andersen began working as a mail boy by day and attended school at night, eventually being hired as the assistant to the comptroller of Allis-Chalmers in Chicago. In 1908, after attending courses at night while working full-time, he graduated from the Kellogg School of Management at Northwestern University with a bachelor's degree in business. That same year, at age 23, he became the youngest Certified Public Accountant in Illinois.

In 1913, Andersen and Clarence DeLany founded an accounting firm as Andersen, DeLany & Co. The firm changed its name to Arthur Andersen & Co. in 1918, as DeLany resigned from the firm. Arthur Andersen's first client was the Joseph Schlitz Brewing Company of Milwaukee, a company where Andersen had worked as a controller. In 1915, due to his many contacts there, the Milwaukee office was opened as the firm's second office.

Andersen believed education was the basis upon which the new profession of accounting should be developed. He created the profession's first centralized training program and believed in training during normal working hours. In 1927, he was elected to the board of trustees of Northwestern University and served as its president from 1930 to 1932. He was also chairman of the board of CPA examiners of Illinois.

=== Reputation ===
Andersen, who headed the firm until his death in 1947, was a zealous supporter of high standards in the accounting industry. A stickler for honesty, he argued that accountants' responsibility was to investors, not their clients' management. This gave rise to the uniform look of all the so-called "Arthur Androids", as employees referred to themselves, the intent being to provide the same service the same way to all customers in all locations. For many years, Andersen's motto was "Think straight, talk straight"—an axiom passed on from his mother. During the early years, it is reputed that Andersen was approached by an executive from a local rail utility to sign off on accounts containing flawed accounting, or else face the loss of a major client. Andersen refused in no uncertain terms, replying that there was "not enough money in the city of Chicago" to make him do it. The railroad fired Andersen, only to go bankrupt a few months later.

Arthur Andersen & Co. also led the way in a number of areas of accounting standards. Being among the first to identify a possible sub-prime bust, Arthur Andersen dissociated itself from a number of clients in the 1970s.

Arthur Andersen & Co. struggled to balance the need to maintain its faithfulness to accounting standards with its clients' desire to maximize profits, particularly in the era of quarterly earnings reports. The firm has been alleged to have been involved in the fraudulent accounting and auditing of Colonial Reality Company (1992), Sunbeam Products (1996), Waste Management (1999), Asia Pulp & Paper (2001), the Baptist Foundation of Arizona (1999), WorldCom, as well as Enron, among others.

=== Andersen Consulting and Accenture ===
The consulting wing of the firm became increasingly important during the 1970s and 1980s, growing at a much faster rate than the more established accounting, auditing, and tax practice. In a further effort to take advantage of economies of scale, Price Waterhouse and Arthur Andersen discussed a merger in 1989 but the negotiations failed, mainly because of conflicts of interest such as Andersen's strong commercial links with IBM and PW's audit of IBM, as well as the two firms' radically different cultures. It was said by those involved with the failed merger that at the end of the discussion, the partners at the table realized they had different views of business, and the potential merger was scrapped.

In 1989, Arthur Andersen and Andersen Consulting became separate units of Andersen Worldwide Société Coopérative. The two businesses spent most of the 1990s in a bitter dispute. Andersen Consulting saw a huge surge in profits during the decade. The consultants, however, continued to resent transfer payments they were required to make to Arthur Andersen. In August 2000, at the conclusion of International Chamber of Commerce arbitration of the dispute, the arbitrators granted Andersen Consulting its independence from Arthur Andersen, but awarded $1.2 billion in past payments (held in escrow pending the ruling) to Arthur Andersen, and declared that Andersen Consulting could no longer use the Andersen name. As a result, Andersen Consulting changed its name to Accenture on January 1, 2001, and Arthur Andersen, having the right to the Andersen Consulting name, rebranded itself to "Andersen".

Four hours after the arbitrator made his ruling, Arthur Andersen CEO Jim Wadia resigned. Industry analysts and business school professors alike viewed the event as a complete victory for Andersen Consulting. Wadia would provide insight on his resignation years later at a Harvard Business school case activity about the split. It turned out that the Arthur Andersen board passed a resolution saying he had to resign if he did not get at least an incremental $4 billion (either through negotiation or via the arbitrator decision) for the consulting practice to split off, hence his quick resignation once the decision was announced.

Accounts vary on why the split occurred—executives on both sides of the split cite greed and arrogance on the part of the other side. The executives on the Andersen Consulting side maintained it was a breach of contract when Arthur Andersen created a second consulting group, AABC (Arthur Andersen Business Consulting) which competed directly with Andersen Consulting in the marketplace.

=== Enron scandal ===
Andersen's auditorial track record received intense scrutiny when a client company, Houston-based energy giant Enron, was found to have fraudulently reported $100 billion in revenue through institutional and systematic accounting fraud. On November 8th, 2001, the U.S. Securities and Exchange Commission (SEC) served Andersen with a subpoena, which was also the same day that Enron filed an 8-K restatement with the SEC that reduced its earnings by $1.2 billion. On December 2nd, Enron filed for Chapter 11 bankruptcy – the largest corporate bankruptcy in American history at the time. On December 12th, Andersen CEO Joseph Berardino testified to two subcommittees of the House Committee on Financial Services. He said that with the larger of the two special-purpose entities with issues prompting the restatement (not named by Berardino, but Chewco, conceived by Enron CFO Andrew Fastow and Enron Global Finance executive Michael Kopper), which he said was responsible for 80%, important information had not been revealed to Andersen’s auditors (referring to a December 1997 side agreement between Chewco and JEDI that meant $6 million of the alleged independent equity from Barclays was no longer at risk) and that the audit committee had been notified of possible illegal acts at Enron. Berardino confessed that Andersen erred on the smaller of the two (also not named, but Swap Sub, part of Fastow's LJM1) but said that Andersen did not cause Enron's collapse.

However, on January 3rd, 2002, Andersen general counsel Andrew Pincus notified Berardino that while Andersen lawyers had been getting employees in Houston ready to testify, their Email records looked too clean. It emerged over the following week that Emails had been deleted and documents destroyed related to Enron, and on January 10th, the firm issued a press release announcing the discovery of document destruction in Houston by individuals in the firm.

On February 1st, the Powers Committee, appointed by Enron's board to look into the firm's accounting in October 2001 and named after and led by William Powers Jr., the holder of the Hines H. Baker and Thelma Kelley Baker Chair at the University of Texas School of Law who had been brought onto the Enron board to lead the investigation, came to the following assessment on Andersen in their report: "The evidence available to us suggests that Andersen did not fulfill its professional responsibilities in connection with its audits of Enron's financial statements, or its obligation to bring to the attention of Enron's Board (or the Audit and Compliance Committee) concerns about Enron's internal contracts over the related-party transactions".

Sherron Watkins, the Enron whistleblower who had previously been an Andersen auditor herself before becoming Enron's Vice President of Corporate Development, also implicated Andersen while testifying to the Subcommittee of Oversight and Investigations of the House Committee of Energy and Commerce on Valentine's Day 2002. Watkins testified that Andersen had signed off on something that they should not have with Enron's related party transactions and that they should have known what they were signing off on. In addition, Andersen professional standards group member Carl Bass had been removed from the account at Enron's request after challenging Enron's accounting for years. In September 2001, he later confronted David Duncan, Andersen's lead partner for the Enron account, and told him that Duncan had done what he had not advised, leading Duncan to concede that Bass had had views on the issues. Bass found out days later that Duncan had also misrepresented his views.

On June 15th, 2002, Andersen was convicted of obstruction of justice for shredding documents related to its audit of Enron. Although the U.S. Supreme Court later reversed the firm's conviction, the impact of the scandal combined with the findings of criminal complicity ultimately destroyed the firm. Duncan and Nancy Temple, a lawyer in the firm's legal department, were cited as the responsible managers in the scandal because they ordered subordinates to shred relevant physical documents and delete relevant Emails – according to Temple's original Email instructions, non-finalized documents in accordance with the firm's document retention policy.

Because the SEC does not accept audits from convicted felons, the firm agreed to surrender its CPA licenses and its right to practice before the SEC on August 31, 2002—effectively putting the firm out of business. It had already started winding down its American operations after the indictment, and many of its accountants joined other firms. The firm sold the majority of its American operations to other accounting firms such as KPMG, Ernst & Young, Deloitte & Touche and Grant Thornton International. At this time, Arthur Andersen had lost most of its business and two-thirds of its 28,000 employees.

The indictment also put a spotlight on the firm's faulty audits of other companies, most notably Waste Management, Sunbeam Products, the Baptist Foundation of Arizona and WorldCom.

On May 31, 2005, in Arthur Andersen LLP v. United States, the Supreme Court unanimously reversed Andersen's conviction because of errors in the trial judge's jury instructions. The Supreme Court held that the instructions were too vague to allow a jury to find that obstruction of justice had occurred. The court found that the instructions were worded in such a way that Andersen could have been convicted without any proof that the firm knew it had broken the law or that there had been a link to any official proceeding that prohibited the destruction of documents. The opinion, written by Chief Justice William Rehnquist, also expressed skepticism of the government's concept of "corrupt persuasion"—persuading someone to engage in an act with an improper purpose without knowing that the act is unlawful.

=== Collapse ===
The firm collapsed by mid-2002, as details of its questionable accounting practices for energy company Enron and telecommunications company Worldcom were revealed amid the two high-profile bankruptcies. The scandals were a factor in the enactment of the Sarbanes–Oxley Act of 2002 to increase oversight and protect whistleblowers. After the collapse, some parts of the company continue to exist: the company's consulting services were split out before the collapse and continue today as Accenture and Protiviti, while some of the former partners formed a new firm in 2002 focused on tax services, now called Andersen Tax.

=== Demise ===
The 2005 Supreme Court ruling theoretically left Andersen free to resume operations. However, CNN reported that by then, Andersen was "nearly defunct," with about 200 employees remaining from a high of 28,000 in 2002. Following the ruling, William Mateja, a former counsel to the US Attorney General who had supervised the Andersen appeal, told NPR that he did not believe the government would seek a retrial because, "there's nothing left of Arthur Andersen, and to spend the taxpayers' money on another prosecution would be just—defy common sense." Echoing this, United States Chamber of Commerce vice president Stephen Bokat pronounced Andersen "dead," and said that "there is no putting the company back together." Kurt Eichenwald, who covered the Enron scandal for the New York Times, argued in his post-mortem, Conspiracy of Fools, that even if Andersen had escaped the Enron scandal, it would have likely been brought down by the massive accounting fraud at WorldCom, which came to light just days after Andersen was convicted of wrongdoing at Enron and ultimately surpassed Enron as the largest corporate bankruptcy in American history at that point.

As a result, Andersen in its original state has never returned as a viable business on even a limited scale. Ownership of the partnership has been ceded to four limited liability companies named Omega Management I through IV.

Arthur Andersen LLP operated the Q Center conference center in St. Charles, Illinois, until day-to-day management was turned over to Dolce Hotels and Resorts in 2014, but Andersen retains ownership. In 2018, that relationship ended, and day-to-day management returned to the Q Center. The Q Center is currently used for training, primarily for internal Accenture personnel, and other large-scale companies.

In 2014, Wealth Tax and Advisory Services (WTAS), a tax and consulting firm started by several former Andersen partners, changed its name to Andersen Tax after acquiring the rights to the Andersen name. It rebranded its year-old international arm, WTAS Global, as Andersen Global.

=== Migration of partners and local offices to new firms ===
Many offices were acquired by other consulting firms as described above. Some partners formed new companies such as:

- Accuracy which was founded in 2004 by a team of seven former partners and is headquartered in Paris
- Andersen Tax which acquired the rights to the company name and changed their name from WTAS in 2014
- BearingPoint, formerly the US consulting unit spun off by KPMG, which purchased Andersen business consulting practices in various countries
- Huron Consulting Group, which was formed by former employees of the Chicago office of Andersen
- West Monroe Partners which was founded in 2002 by a few former consultants, based in Chicago
- Navigant Consulting which absorbed eight partners from Andersen
- Protiviti was formed in 2002 by hiring more than 700 professionals who had been affiliated with the internal audit, business and technology risk consulting practice of Arthur Andersen.
- SMART Business Advisory and Consulting which absorbed some staff
- jcba Limited which was founded by a partner from the aviation practice
- True Partners Consulting, a tax consultancy founded by Arthur Andersen alumni

== See also ==
- Accounting scandals
- Conspiracy of Fools
- Corporate abuse
- David J. Lesar
- Timeline of the Enron scandal
