= List of American films of 2003 =

This is a list of American films released in 2003.

== Box office ==
The highest-grossing American films released in 2003, by domestic box office gross revenue, are as follows:

Highest-grossing films of 2003
Rank	Title	Distributor	Domestic gross
1	The Lord of the Rings: The Return of the King	New Line Cinema	$377,027,325
2	Finding Nemo	Disney	$339,714,184
3	Pirates of the Caribbean: The Curse of the Black Pearl	Disney	$305,398,779
4	The Matrix Reloaded	Warner Bros. Pictures	$281,576,461
5	Bruce Almighty	Universal Pictures	$242,829,261
6	X2	20th Century Fox	$214,949,694
7	Elf	New Line Cinema	$167,547,000
8	Terminator 3: Rise of the Machines	Warner Bros. Pictures	$150,371,112
9	The Matrix Revolutions	Warner Bros. Pictures	$139,313,948
10	Cheaper by the Dozen	20th Century Fox	$138,614,544

== January–March ==
Opening		Title	Production company	Cast and crew	Ref.
J A N U A R Y	10	Just Married	20th Century Fox	Shawn Levy (director); Sam Harper (screenplay); Ashton Kutcher, Brittany Murphy, Christian Kane, David Moscow, Monet Mazur, David Rasche, Veronica Cartwright, Thad Luckinbill, Taran Killam, Raymond J. Barry, George Gaynes, Alex Thomas, Valeria Andrews	
J A N U A R Y	17	City of God	Miramax Films	Fernando Meirelles (director); Alexandre Rodrigues, Leandro Firmino da Hora, Phellipe Haagensen, Douglas Silva, Jonathan Haagensen, Matheus Nachtergaele, Seu Jorge	
J A N U A R Y	17	A Guy Thing	Metro-Goldwyn-Mayer	Chris Koch (director); Greg Glienna, Pete Schwaba, Matt Tarses, Bill Wrubel (screenplay); Jason Lee, Julia Stiles, Selma Blair, James Brolin, Shawn Hatosy, Lochlyn Munro, Diana Scarwid, David Koechner, Julie Hagerty, Thomas Lennon, Jackie Burroughs, Jay Brazeau, Larry Miller, Matthew Walker, Fred Ewanuick, Victor Varnado, Dylan Winner, Lisa Calder	
J A N U A R Y	17	Kangaroo Jack	Warner Bros. Pictures / Castle Rock Entertainment / Jerry Bruckheimer Films	David McNally (director); Steve Bing, Scott Rosenberg (screenplay); Jerry O'Connell, Anthony Anderson, Estella Warren, Michael Shannon, Christopher Walken, Dyan Cannon, Adam Garcia, Frank Welker, Marton Csokas, Bill Hunter, Tony Nikolakopoulos, David Ngoombujarra, Christopher James Baker, Lara Cox	
J A N U A R Y	17	National Security	Columbia Pictures	Dennis Dugan (director); Jay Scherick, David Ronn (screenplay); Martin Lawrence, Steve Zahn, Colm Feore, Bill Duke, Eric Roberts, Timothy Busfield, Robinne Lee, Matt McCoy, Brett Cullen, Mari Morrow, Leslie Jones, Stephen Tobolowsky, Margaret Travolta, Noel Gugliemi, Jonathan Loughran, Hal Fishman, Martin Klebba, Cleo King, Ken Lerner, Joe Flaherty, Carl Ciarfalio, Jeffrey Ross, Hiep Thi Le, Amy Aquino, Daniel Sudick, Greg Serano	
J A N U A R Y	21	101 Dalmatians II: Patch's London Adventure	Walt Disney Home Entertainment	Jim Kammerud, Brian Smith (directors/screenplay); Barry Bostwick, Jason Alexander, Martin Short, Bobby Lockwood, Susanne Blakeslee, Samuel West, Jeff Bennett, Maurice LaMarche, Jodi Benson, Jim Cummings, Tim Bentinck, Kath Soucie, Mary MacLeod, Michael Lerner, Kathryn Beaumont, Kasha Kropinski, Ben Tibber, Eli Russell Linnetz	
J A N U A R Y	24	Darkness Falls	Columbia Pictures / Revolution Studios / Distant Corners	Jonathan Liebesman (director); Joe Harris, James Vanderbilt, John Fasano (screenplay); Chaney Kley, Emma Caulfield, Lee Cormie, Grant Piro, John Stanton, Sullivan Stapleton, Steve Mouzakis, Peter Curtin, Kestie Morassi, Jenny Lovell, Emily Browning, Antony Burrows, Korie Ferguson, Rebecca McCauley, Andrew Dauchy, Gary A. Hecker	
J A N U A R Y	24	Super Sucker	Purple Rose Films	Jeff Daniels (director); Jeff Daniels, Dawn Wells, Harve Presnell, Matt Letscher	
J A N U A R Y	31	Biker Boyz	DreamWorks	Reggie Rock Bythewood (director/screenplay); Craig Fernandez (screenplay); Laurence Fishburne, Derek Luke, Orlando Jones, Djimon Hounsou, Lisa Bonet, Kid Rock, Brendan Fehr, Larenz Tate, Terrence Howard, Rick Gonzalez, Meagan Good, Salli Richardson-Whitfield, Vanessa Bell Calloway, Dante Basco, Kadeem Hardison, Dion Basco, Tyson Beckford, Eriq La Salle, Nicholas Sheriff	
J A N U A R Y	31	Final Destination 2	New Line Cinema	David R. Ellis (director); J. Mackye Gruber, Eric Bress (screenplay); Ali Larter, A.J. Cook, Michael Landes, David Paetkau, Lynda Boyd, Keegan Connor Tracy, T.C. Carson, Justina Machado, Tony Todd, Sarah Carter, Shaun Sipos, Andrew Airlie, Eileen Pedde, Noel Fisher, Benita Ha, Aaron Douglas, Eric Keenleyside, Veena Sood, Alf Humphreys, James Kirk, Jonathan Cherry, Alex Rae, Enid-Raye Adams	
J A N U A R Y	31	The Guru	Universal Pictures / StudioCanal / Working Title Films	Daisy von Scherler Mayer (director); Tracey Jackson (screenplay); Jimi Mistry, Heather Graham, Marisa Tomei, Michael McKean, Christine Baranski, Dash Mihok, Bobby Cannavale, Emil Marwa, Ronald Guttman, Malachy McCourt, Ajay Naidu, Anita Gillette, Pat McNamara, Dwight Ewell	
J A N U A R Y	31	Lost in La Mancha	IFC Films	Keith Fulton, Louis Pepe (director); Terry Gilliam, Johnny Depp, Jean Rochefort, Jeff Bridges	
J A N U A R Y	31	The Recruit	Touchstone Pictures / Spyglass Entertainment	Roger Donaldson (director); Roger Towne, Kurt Wimmer, Mitch Glazer (screenplay); Al Pacino, Colin Farrell, Bridget Moynahan, Gabriel Macht, Kenneth Mitchell, Karl Pruner	
F E B R U A R Y	7	Deliver Us from Eva	Focus Features	Gary Hardwick (director/screenplay); James Iver Mattson, B. E. Brauner (screenplay); LL Cool J, Gabrielle Union, Essence Atkins, Duane Martin, Mel Jackson, Meagan Good, Robinne Lee, Kym Whitley, Dartanyan Edmonds, Nikki Washington, Royale Watkins, Matt Winston, Ruben Paul, Dorian Gregory, Kenya Moore, Jazsmin Lewis, Terry Dexter, Aloma Wright, Henry Kingi Jr., Stephen Saux, Terry Crews	
F E B R U A R Y	7	How to Lose a Guy in 10 Days	Paramount Pictures	Donald Petrie (director); Kristen Buckley, Brian Regan, Burr Steers (screenplay); Kate Hudson, Matthew McConaughey, Kathryn Hahn, Annie Parisse, Adam Goldberg, Thomas Lennon, Michael Michele, Shalom Harlow, Robert Klein, Bebe Neuwirth, Liliane Montevecchi, Marvin Hamlisch, Celia Weston, John DiResta, Georgia Craig, Tony Longo, Warner Wolf, Natalie Brown, Andrew Moodie, William Duell, Diego Fuentes, Marv Albert, Craig Castaldo	
F E B R U A R Y	7	Shanghai Knights	Touchstone Pictures / Spyglass Entertainment	David Dobkin (director); Alfred Gough, Miles Millar (screenplay); Jackie Chan, Owen Wilson, Fann Wong, Donnie Yen, Aidan Gillen, Aaron Taylor-Johnson, Tom Fisher, Oliver Cotton, Kim Chan, Gemma Jones, Tom Wu, Kelly-Marie Kerr, Constantine Gregory, Ray Dunn, Barbara Nedeljakova, Anna-Louise Plowman, Georgina Chapman, Daisy Beaumont, Alison King	
F E B R U A R Y	14	Daredevil	20th Century Fox / Regency Enterprises / Marvel Enterprises	Mark Steven Johnson (director/screenplay); Ben Affleck, Jennifer Garner, Michael Clarke Duncan, Colin Farrell, Joe Pantoliano, Jon Favreau, David Keith, Erick Avari, Mark Margolis, Leland Orser, Ellen Pompeo, Derrick O'Connor, Stan Lee, Frank Miller, Kevin Smith, Paul Ben-Victor, Josie DiVincenzo, Tanoai Reed, Lennie Loftin, Scott Terra, John Rothman, Pat Crawford Brown, Robert Iler, Kane Hodder	
F E B R U A R Y	14	The Jungle Book 2	Walt Disney Pictures / Disneytoon Studios	Steve Trenbirth (director); Karl Geurs (screenplay); John Goodman, Haley Joel Osment, Mae Whitman, Bob Joles, Tony Jay, Phil Collins, John Rhys-Davies, Jim Cummings, Bobby Edner, Jeff Bennett, Brian Cummings, Jess Harnell, Devika Parikh, Connor Funk, Baron Davis, Veena Bidasha, J. Grant Albrecht	
F E B R U A R Y	21	Dark Blue	United Artists / Intermedia	Ron Shelton (director); David Ayer, James Ellroy (screenplay); Kurt Russell, Scott Speedman, Michael Michele, Brendan Gleeson, Ving Rhames, Master P, Kurupt, Dash Mihok, Jonathan Banks, Lolita Davidovich, Khandi Alexander	
F E B R U A R Y	21	Gods and Generals	Warner Bros. Pictures	Ronald F. Maxwell (director/screenplay); Jeff Daniels, Robert Duvall, Kevin Conway, C. Thomas Howell, Stephen Lang, Mira Sorvino, Jeremy London, Matt Letscher, Brian Mallon, Bo Brinkman, Bruce Boxleitner, William Sanderson, Billy Campbell, Alex Hyde-White, Joseph Fuqua, John Prosky, Royce D. Applegate, Patrick Gorman, W. Morgan Sheppard, James Patrick Stuart, Jonathon Demers, Andrew Prine, James Garrett, J. Scott Watkins, Fred Griffith, Tim O'Hare, John Castle, Matt Lindquist, Ted Turner, Lester Kinsolving, Cooper Huckabee, Kali Rocha, Donzaleigh Abernathy, Karen Hochstetter, Martin Clark, Christie Lynn Smith, Lydia Jordan, George Allen, Robert Byrd, Phil Gramm, Dana Rohrabacher, Ed Markey	
F E B R U A R Y	21	The Life of David Gale	Universal Pictures / Intermedia / Saturn Films	Alan Parker (director); Charles Randolph (screenplay); Kevin Spacey, Kate Winslet, Laura Linney, Gabriel Mann, Matt Craven, Leon Rippy, Jim Beaver, Rhona Mitra, Melissa McCarthy, Cleo King	
F E B R U A R Y	21	Old School	DreamWorks / The Montecito Picture Company	Todd Phillips (director/screenplay); Scot Armstrong (screenplay); Luke Wilson, Will Ferrell, Vince Vaughn, Ellen Pompeo, Juliette Lewis, Leah Remini, Perrey Reeves, Craig Kilborn, Jeremy Piven, Patrick Fischler, Sara Tanaka, Simon Helberg, Seann William Scott, Elisha Cuthbert, Patrick J. Adams, Patrick Cranshaw, Rick Gonzalez, Jerod Mixon, Matt Walsh, Artie Lange, Rob Corddry, Bryan Callen, Harve Presnell, Snoop Dogg, James Carville, Warren G, Kokane, Allen Haff, Todd Phillips, Terry O'Quinn, Andy Dick, Bishop Don "Magic" Juan, Ashley Jones, Arthur Taxier, Abdul Goznobi, Kristina Hughes, Bob Lazar	
F E B R U A R Y	28	Cradle 2 the Grave	Warner Bros. Pictures / Silver Pictures	Andrzej Bartkowiak (director); John O'Brien, Channing Gibson (screenplay); Jet Li, DMX, Anthony Anderson, Kelly Hu, Tom Arnold, Mark Dacascos, Gabrielle Union, Drag-On, Anthony Anderson, Paige Hurd, Paolo Seganti, Michael Jace, Ron Yuan, Chi McBride, Lester Speight, Randy Couture, Martin Klebba, Johnny Tri Nguyen, Tito Ortiz, Hector Echavarria, Chuck Liddell, Daniel Dae Kim, William L. Johnson, Kevin Grevioux	
F E B R U A R Y	28	Poolhall Junkies	Samuel Goldwyn Films / Gold Circle Films	Mars Callahan (director/screenplay); Chris Corso (screenplay); Mars Callahan, Chazz Palminteri, Rod Steiger, Michael Rosenbaum, Rick Schroder, Alison Eastwood, Christopher Walken, Mike Massey, Richard Portnow, Ernie Reyes, Jr., Glenn Plummer, Anson Mount, Phillip Glasser, Peter Mark Richman, Peter Dobson	
M A R C H	4	Scooby-Doo and the Legend of the Vampire	Warner Bros. Animation / Warner Bros. Family Entertainment / Warner Home Video	Scott Jeralds (director); Mark Turosz (screenplay); Frank Welker, Casey Kasem, Nicole Jaffe, Heather North, Phil LaMarr, Jeff Bennett, Kevin Michael Richardson, Jennifer Hale, Jane Wiedlin, Kimberly Brooks, Tom Kenny, Michael Neill	
M A R C H	7	Bringing Down the House	Touchstone Pictures / Hyde Park Entertainment	Adam Shankman (director); Jason Filardi (screenplay); Steve Martin, Queen Latifah, Eugene Levy, Joan Plowright, Jean Smart, Missi Pyle, Betty White, Kimberly J. Brown, Angus T. Jones, Steve Harris, Michael Rosenbaum, Jim Haynie, Matt Lutz, Victor Webster, Kelly Price, Bronzell Miller, Randy Oglesby, Jesse Corti, Vincent M. Ward, Michael Ensign, Anne Fletcher, John Prosky, Alonzo Bodden, Walter Addison, Deezer D, Cris Judd, Montrose Hagins, Bibi Nshimba	
M A R C H	7	Tears of the Sun	Columbia Pictures / Revolution Studios / Cheyenne Enterprises	Antoine Fuqua (director); Alex Lasker, Patrick Cirillo (screenplay); Bruce Willis, Monica Bellucci, Cole Hauser, Tom Skerritt, Eamonn Walker, Johnny Messner, Nick Chinlund, Fionnula Flanagan, Pierrino Mascarino, Peter Mensah, Akosua Busia, Sammi Rotibi, Paul Francis, Charles Ingram, Chad Smith, Cornelia Hayes O'Herlihy, Malick Bowens, Benjamin Ochieng	
M A R C H	11	Inspector Gadget 2	Walt Disney Home Entertainment / Walt Disney Pictures / The Kerner Entertainment Company / Fountain Productions	Alex Zamm (director/screenplay); Ron Anderson, William Robertson (screenplay); French Stewart, Elaine Hendrix, Tony Martin, Caitlin Wachs, Jeff Bennett, D.L. Hughley, Mark Mitchell, Sigrid Thornton, Bruce Spence, John Batchelor, Mungo McKay, Alethea McGrath, James Wardlaw, Nick Lawson, Mick Roughan, Siros Niaros, Brian McDermott	
M A R C H	14	Agent Cody Banks	Metro-Goldwyn-Mayer	Harald Zwart (director); Scott Alexander, Larry Karaszewski, Zack Stentz, Ashley Edward Miller (screenplay); Frankie Muniz, Hilary Duff, Angie Harmon, Keith David, Cynthia Stevenson, Arnold Vosloo, Daniel Roebuck, Ian McShane, Darrell Hammond, Martin Donovan, Connor Widdows, Peter New, Noel Fisher, Jessica Harmon, Chris Gauthier, Harry Van Gorkum, Jared Van Snellenberg, Andrew Francis, Tseng Chang, Eric Keenleyside, Terence Kelly, Prevail, Alex Diakun, Ty Olsson, Lorena Gale	
M A R C H	14	The Hunted	Paramount Pictures / Lakeshore Entertainment / Alphaville Films	William Friedkin (director); David Griffiths, Peter Griffiths, Art Monterastelli (screenplay); Tommy Lee Jones, Benicio del Toro, Connie Nielsen, Leslie Stefanson, John Finn, Jose Zuniga, Ron Canada, Mark Pellegrino, Jenna Boyd, Lonny Chapman, Rex Linn, Johnny Cash, Eddie Velez, Aaron DeCone, Carrick O'Quinn, Alexander McKenzie	
M A R C H	14	Willard	New Line Cinema	Glen Morgan (director/screenplay); Stephen Gilbert (screenplay); Crispin Glover, R. Lee Ermey, Laura Harring, Jackie Burroughs, Kimberly Patton, William S. Taylor, Ty Olsson, Bruce Davison	
M A R C H	16	Normal	HBO Films	Jane Anderson (director/screenplay); Jessica Lange, Tom Wilkinson, Clancy Brown, Hayden Panettiere, Joseph Sikora, Richard Bull, Rondi Reed, Mary Seibel, Randall Arney	
M A R C H	18	Charlotte's Web 2: Wilbur's Great Adventure	Paramount Home Entertainment / Paramount Pictures / Universal Cartoon Studios / Nickelodeon Animation Studio	Mario Piluso (director); Elana Lesser, Cliff Ruby (screenplay); Julia Duffy, David Berón, Charlie Adler, Amanda Bynes, Anndi McAfee, Maria Bamford, Harrison Chad, Rob Paulsen, Debi Derryberry, Laraine Newman, Dawnn Lewis, Danny Mann, Brenda Vaccaro, Jerry Houser, Nika Futterman, Pat Fraley, Frank Welker, Valery Pappas, Bridget Sienna, Bobby Block, Ashley Edner	
M A R C H	21	Boat Trip	Artisan Entertainment	Mort Nathan (director/screenplay); William Bigelow (screenplay); Cuba Gooding, Jr., Horatio Sanz, Roselyn Sánchez, Vivica A. Fox, Maurice Godin, Roger Moore, Lin Shaye, Victoria Silvstedt, Ken Hudson Campbell, Zen Gesner, William Bumiller, Noah York, Thomas Lennon, Richard Roundtree, Bob Gunton, Jennifer Gareis, Will Ferrell, Artie Lange, Jamie Ferrell	
M A R C H	21	Dreamcatcher	Warner Bros. Pictures / Castle Rock Entertainment / Village Roadshow Pictures	Lawrence Kasdan (director/screenplay); William Goldman (screenplay); Thomas Jane, Jason Lee, Timothy Olyphant, Damian Lewis, Morgan Freeman, Tom Sizemore, Donnie Wahlberg, Michael O'Neill, Eric Keenleyside, Rosemary Dunsmore, Campbell Lane, C. Ernst Harth, Ingrid Kavelaars, Darrin Klimek	
M A R C H	21	Piglet's Big Movie	Walt Disney Pictures	Francis Glebas (director); Brian Hohlfeld (screenplay); John Fiedler, Jim Cummings, Nikita Hopkins, Peter Cullen, Ken Sansom, Kath Soucie, Andre Stojka, Tom Wheatley	
M A R C H	21	View from the Top	Miramax Films	Bruno Barreto (director); Eric Wald (screenplay); Gwyneth Paltrow, Christina Applegate, Mark Ruffalo, Candice Bergen, Joshua Malina, Kelly Preston, Rob Lowe, Mike Myers, Marc Blucas, Stacey Dash, Jon Polito, Concetta Tomei, Robyn Peterson, Nadia Dajani, John Francis Daley, Frederick Coffin, Troy Evans, Matt Roth, Connie Sawyer, Priscilla Lee Taylor, Jeff Yagher, Jessica Capshaw, Roark Critchlow, Chad Everett, Wayne Federman, Gavin Fink, George Kennedy, Stephen Tobolowsky	
M A R C H	28	Assassination Tango	United Artists / American Zoetrope	Robert Duvall (director/screenplay); Robert Duvall, Rubén Blades, Kathy Baker, Luciana Pedraza, Katherine Micheaux Miller, Julio Oscar Mechoso, James Keane, Frank Gio, Frank Cassavetes, Michael Corrente, Raul Outeda, Geraldine Rojas, Elbio Nessier, María Nieves	
M A R C H	28	Basic	Columbia Pictures / Intermedia / Phoenix Pictures	John McTiernan (director); James Vanderbilt (screenplay); John Travolta, Samuel L. Jackson, Connie Nielsen, Tim Daly, Giovanni Ribisi, Brian Van Holt, Taye Diggs, Dash Mihok, Cristián de la Fuente, Roselyn Sánchez, Harry Connick Jr., Margaret Travolta, Nick Loren	
M A R C H	28	Blue Collar Comedy Tour: The Movie	Warner Bros. Pictures	C.B. Harding (director); Jeff Foxworthy, Bill Engvall, Larry the Cable Guy, Ron White, David Alan Grier	
M A R C H	28	The Core	Paramount Pictures	Jon Amiel (director); Cooper Layne, John Rogers (screenplay); Aaron Eckhart, Hilary Swank, Delroy Lindo, Stanley Tucci, DJ Qualls, Richard Jenkins, Tchéky Karyo, Bruce Greenwood, Alfre Woodard, Fred Ewanuick	
M A R C H	28	Head of State	DreamWorks	Chris Rock (director/screenplay); Ali LeRoi (screenplay); Chris Rock, Bernie Mac, Dylan Baker, Nick Searcy, Lynn Whitfield, Robin Givens, Tamala Jones, James Rebhorn, Keith David, Stephanie March, Ron Killings, Nate Dogg, DJ Quik, Tracy Morgan, Jeff Jarrett, B.G. James, Jeremy Borash, Ron Harris, Robert Stanton, Jude Ciccolella, Elizabeth Johnson, Ned Eisenberg, Reg E. Cathey, Brad Marshall, Patrice O'Neal, Mario Joyner, Clarke Peters, Delaney Williams, Wes Johnson, Mike Hodge, Heather Alicia Simms, Jimmy Tingle, Lois Kelso Hunt, Novella Nelson, Ali LeRoi, Sade Baderinwa, Tony Harris, Funkmaster Flex, Chandra Wilson	

== April–June ==
Opening		Title	Production company	Cast and crew	Ref.
A P R I L	4	A Man Apart	New Line Cinema	F. Gary Gray (director); Christian Gudegast, Paul Scheuring (screenplay); Vin Diesel, Larenz Tate, Timothy Olyphant, Geno Silva, Jacqueline Obradors, Karrine Steffans, Steve Eastin, Juan Fernandez, Jeff Kober, Marco Rodriguez, Emilio Rivera, Alice Amter, Ken Davitian, Mike Moroff, George Sharperson, Malieek Straughter	
A P R I L	4	Phone Booth	20th Century Fox / Fox 2000 Pictures	Joel Schumacher (director); Larry Cohen (screenplay); Colin Farrell, Kiefer Sutherland, Forest Whitaker, Radha Mitchell, Katie Holmes, Paula Jai Parker, Tia Texada, John Enos III, Richard T. Jones, Keith Nobbs, Josh Pais, Ben Foster	
A P R I L	4	What a Girl Wants	Warner Bros. Pictures / Gaylord Films	Dennie Gordon (director); Jenny Bicks, Elizabeth Chandler (screenplay); Amanda Bynes, Colin Firth, Kelly Preston, Oliver James, Eileen Atkins, Jonathan Pryce, Anna Chancellor, Christina Cole, Sylvia Syms, James Greene, Tara Summers, Ben Scholfield, Roger Ashton-Griffiths, Cassie Powney, Connie Powney	
A P R I L	4	Dysfunktional Family	Miramax Films / Gold Circle Films	George Gallo (director); Eddie Griffin	
A P R I L	11	Anger Management	Columbia Pictures / Revolution Studios	Peter Segal (director); David S. Dorfman (screenplay); Adam Sandler, Jack Nicholson, Marisa Tomei, Luis Guzmán, Jonathan Loughran, Kurt Fuller, Krista Allen, January Jones, Clint Black, John Turturro, Lynne Thigpen, Woody Harrelson, Kevin Nealon, Allen Covert, Nancy Carell, John C. Reilly, Heather Graham, Harry Dean Stanton, Isaac C. Singleton Jr., Stephen Dunham, Cody Arens, John McEnroe, Derek Jeter, Robert Merrill, Bob Sheppard, Judith Nathan, Bob Knight, Roger Clemens, Rudy Giuliani	
A P R I L	11	House of 1000 Corpses	Lions Gate Films	Rob Zombie (director/screenplay); Sid Haig, Bill Moseley, Sheri Moon Zombie, Karen Black, Chris Hardwick, Erin Daniels, Jennifer Jostyn, Rainn Wilson, Walton Goggins, Tom Towles, Matthew McGrory, Robert Allen Mukes, Dennis Fimple, Harrison Young, William Bassett, Irwin Keyes, Michael J. Pollard, Chad Bannon, David Reynolds, Walter Phelan, Jake McKinnon	
A P R I L	16	Bulletproof Monk	Metro-Goldwyn-Mayer / Lakeshore Entertainment / Mosaic Media Group	Paul Hunter (director); Ethan Reiff, Cyrus Voris (screenplay); Chow Yun-fat, Seann William Scott, Jaime King, Karel Roden, Victoria Smurfit, Roger Yuan, Mako, Marcus Jean Pirae	
A P R I L	16	Chasing Papi	20th Century Fox / Fox 2000 Pictures	Linda Mendoza (director); Roselyn Sánchez, Sofía Vergara, Jaci Velasquez, Eduardo Verástegui, Lisa Vidal, D. L. Hughley, Freddy Rodriguez	
A P R I L	16	A Mighty Wind	Warner Bros. Pictures / Castle Rock Entertainment	Christopher Guest (director/screenplay); Eugene Levy (screenplay); Bob Balaban, Catherine O'Hara, Eugene Levy, Christopher Guest, Michael McKean, Harry Shearer, Jane Lynch, John Michael Higgins, Parker Posey, Fred Willard, Jennifer Coolidge, Christopher Moynihan, Jim Piddock, Don Lake, Deborah Theaker, Ed Begley Jr., Michael Hitchcock, Larry Miller, Rachael Harris, Paul Dooley, Jim Moret, Laura Harris, Stuart Luce, Mary Gross, Marty Belafsky, Paul Benedict, Wendel Meldrum	
A P R I L	18	Holes	Walt Disney Pictures / Walden Media	Andrew Davis (director); Louis Sachar (screenplay); Shia LaBeouf, Sigourney Weaver, Jon Voight, Patricia Arquette, Tim Blake Nelson, Khleo Thomas, Brenden Jefferson, Jake M. Smith, Miguel Castro, Byron Cotton, Max Kasch, Dulé Hill, Henry Winkler, Siobhan Fallon Hogan, Nathan Davis, Noah Poletiek, Rick Fox, Scott Plank, Eartha Kitt, Roma Maffia, Zane Holtz, Shelley Malil, Damien Luvara, Sanya Mateyas, Ravil Isyanov, Ken Davitian, Steve Koslowski, Michael Cavanaugh	
A P R I L	18	Malibu's Most Wanted	Warner Bros. Pictures	John Whitesell (director); Fax Bahr, Adam Small, Jamie Kennedy, Nick Swardson (screenplay); Jamie Kennedy, Taye Diggs, Anthony Anderson, Blair Underwood, Regina Hall, Damien Dante Wayans, Bo Derek, Ryan O'Neal, Jeffrey Tambor, Kal Penn, Snoop Dogg, Nick Swardson, Keili Lefkovitz, Kellie Martin, Greg Grunberg, J.P. Manoux, Terry Crews, Noel Gugliemi, Mike Epps, Felli Fel, Hi-C, Young Dre The Truth, Drop da Bomb, Hal Fishman, Big Boy	
A P R I L	25	Confidence	Lions Gate Films	James Foley (director); Doug Jung (screenplay); Edward Burns, Rachel Weisz, Andy García, Dustin Hoffman, Paul Giamatti, Luis Guzmán, Donal Logue, Brian Van Holt, Franky G, Morris Chestnut, Louis Lombardi, John Carroll Lynch, Robert Forster, Leland Orser	
A P R I L	25	The Good Thief	Fox Searchlight Pictures	Neil Jordan (director/screenplay); Nick Nolte, Emir Kusturica, Nutsa Kukhianidze, Tcheky Karyo, Saïd Taghmaoui, Patricia Kell, Gerard Darmon, Julien Maurel, Sarah Bridges, Ralph Fiennes	
A P R I L	25	Identity	Columbia Pictures	James Mangold (director); Michael Cooney (screenplay); John Cusack, Ray Liotta, Amanda Peet, Alfred Molina, Clea DuVall, Rebecca De Mornay, John Hawkes, William Lee Scott, Leila Kenzle, John C. McGinley, Bret Loehr, Jake Busey, Pruitt Taylor Vince, Holmes Osborne, Frederick Coffin, Carmen Argenziano, Matt Letscher, Marshall Bell	
A P R I L	25	It Runs in the Family	Metro-Goldwyn-Mayer	Fred Schepisi (director); Jesse Wigutow (screenplay); Michael Douglas, Kirk Douglas, Cameron Douglas, Diana Dill, Rory Culkin, Bernadette Peters, Michelle Monaghan, Geoffrey Arend, Sarita Choudhury, Irene Gorovaia, Annie Golden, Mark Hammer, Audra McDonald, Josh Pais, Louie Torrellas, Adrian Martinez	
A P R I L	25	The Real Cancun	New Line Cinema	Rick de Oliviera (director); Brian Caldirola (screenplay); Benjamin Fletcher, Nicole Frilot, Roxanne Frilot	
M A Y	2	The Dancer Upstairs	Fox Searchlight Pictures	John Malkovich (director); Nicholas Shakespeare (screenplay); Javier Bardem, Juan Diego Botto, Laura Morante, Elvira Mínguez, Wolframio Sinué, Abel Folk, Alexandra Lencastre, Oliver Cotton, Luis Miguel Cintra, Natalia Dicenta, John Malkovich	
M A Y	2	The Lizzie McGuire Movie	Walt Disney Pictures	Jim Fall (director); Susan Estelle Jansen, Ed Decter, John J. Strauss (screenplay); Hilary Duff, Adam Lamberg, Hallie Todd, Robert Carradine, Yani Gellman, Jake Thomas, Alex Borstein, Clayton Snyder, Ashlie Brillault, Brendan Kelly, Carly Schroeder, Daniel Escobar, Jody Raicot, Terra MacLeod	
M A Y	2	X2	20th Century Fox / Marvel Enterprises	Bryan Singer (director); Michael Dougherty, Dan Harris, David Hayter (screenplay); Hugh Jackman, Patrick Stewart, Ian McKellen, Halle Berry, James Marsden, Famke Janssen, Brian Cox, Alan Cumming, Anna Paquin, Rebecca Romijn-Stamos, Kelly Hu, Shawn Ashmore, Aaron Stanford, Bruce Davison, Daniel Cudmore, Cotter Smith, Katie Stuart, Layke Anderson, Steve Bacic, Kurt Max Runte, Chiara Zanni, Roger R. Cross, Greg Rikaart, Ty Olsson, Brad Loree, Connor Widdows, Peter Wingfield, Alfred E. Humphreys, Dylan Kussman, Aaron Douglas, Colin Lawrence, Nolan Funk, Mike Dopud, Emily Hirst, David Kaye, Rajesh Khattar, Blake Mawson, Mike Mitchell, Jade Ramsey, Newton Thomas Sigel, Bryan Singer, Michael Reid MacKay, Keely Purvis, Bryce Hodgson, Kea Wong, Shauna Kain	
M A Y	9	Daddy Day Care	Columbia Pictures / Revolution Studios	Steve Carr (director); Geoff Rodkey (screenplay); Eddie Murphy, Jeff Garlin, Steve Zahn, Regina King, Kevin Nealon, Anjelica Huston, Lacey Chabert, Khamani Griffin, Jonathan Katz, Max Burkholder, Jimmy Bennett, Leila Arcieri, Shane Baumel, Elle Fanning, Siobhan Fallon Hogan, Wallace Langham, Lisa Edelstein, Mark Griffin, Laura Kightlinger, Felix Achille, Hailey Noelle Johnson, Arthur Young, Cheap Trick	
M A Y	9	The Shape of Things	Focus Features / StudioCanal / Working Title Films	Neil LaBute (director/screenplay); Paul Rudd, Rachel Weisz, Gretchen Mol, Fred Weller	
M A Y	15	The Matrix Reloaded	Warner Bros. Pictures / Village Roadshow Pictures / Silver Pictures	The Wachowskis (directors/screenplay); Keanu Reeves, Laurence Fishburne, Carrie-Anne Moss, Hugo Weaving, Jada Pinkett Smith, Harold Perrineau, Randall Duk Kim, Gloria Foster, Monica Bellucci, Lambert Wilson, Leigh Whannell, Collin Chou, Nona Gaye, Anthony Zerbe, Harry Lennix, Steve Bastoni, David Roberts, Helmut Bakaitis, Daniel Bernhardt, Gina Torres, Roy Jones Jr., Matt McColm, Cornel West, Anthony Wong, Ian Bliss, Neil and Adrian Rayment, Donald Anjaya Batte, David A. Kilde	
M A Y	16	Down with Love	20th Century Fox / Fox 2000 Pictures / Regency Enterprises	Peyton Reed (director); Eve Ahlert, Dennis Drake (screenplay); Ewan McGregor, Renée Zellweger, David Hyde Pierce, Sarah Paulson, Rachel Dratch, Jack Plotnick, Tony Randall, John Aylward, Warren Munson, Matt Ross, Michael Ensign, Timothy Omundson, Jeri Ryan, Ivana Milicevic, Melissa George, Matt Adler, Maggie Baird, John Cappelletti, Robert Clotworthy, Kat Cressida, Bridget Hoffman, Matthew Labyorteaux, Luisa Leschin, Scott Menville, Tony Pope, Jill Remez, Steve Staley, Laura Summer	
M A Y	16	Pokémon Heroes	Miramax Films	Kunihiko Yuyama (director); Hideki Sonoda (screenplay); Veronica Taylor, Rachael Lillis, Eric Stuart, Ikue Ōtani, Megumi Hayashibara, Megan Hollingshead, Lisa Ortiz, Michael Sinterniklaas, Wayne Grayson, Tara Sands, Maddie Blaustein, Kayzie Rogers, Rodger Parsons	
M A Y	23	Bruce Almighty	Universal Pictures / Spyglass Entertainment	Tom Shadyac (director); Steve Koren, Mark O'Keefe, Steve Oedekerk (screenplay); Jim Carrey, Morgan Freeman, Jennifer Aniston, Philip Baker Hall, Catherine Bell, Lisa Ann Walter, Steve Carell, Nora Dunn, Eddie Jemison, Sally Kirkland, Micah Stephen Williams, Tony Bennett, Carlos Sanchez, John Murphy, Madeline Lovejoy, Noel Gugliemi, Paul Satterfield, Mark Kiely, Lillian Adams, Rolando Molina, Emilio Rivera, Alfred Dennis, Robert Curtis Brown, Shaun Robinson, Gina St. John, Dougald Park, Mary Pat Gleason, Carey Scott, Bradley Stryker, Dohn Norwood, Ara Celi, Janelle Pierzina, Annie Wersching, Max Grodénchik, Colby French, P.J. Byrne, Ron Jeremy	
M A Y	23	The In-Laws	Warner Bros. Pictures / Franchise Pictures	Andrew Fleming (director); Andrew Bergman, Nat Mauldin, Ed Solomon (screenplay); Michael Douglas, Albert Brooks, Robin Tunney, Ryan Reynolds, David Suchet, Lindsay Sloane, Candice Bergen, Maria Ricossa, Vladimir Radian, Michael Bodnar, Boyd Banks, Susan Aceron, Chang Tseng, Tamara Gorski, Matt Birman, Russell Andrews, Richard Waugh, Kristin Chenoweth	
M A Y	25	My House in Umbria	HBO Films	Richard Loncraine (director); Hugh Whitemore (screenplay); Maggie Smith, Chris Cooper, Timothy Spall, Emmy Clarke, Ronnie Barker, Benno Fürmann, Giancarlo Giannini, Libero De Rienzo, Cecilia Dazzi	
M A Y	30	Finding Nemo	Walt Disney Pictures / Pixar Animation Studios	Andrew Stanton (director/screenplay); Bob Peterson, David Reynolds (screenplay); Albert Brooks, Ellen DeGeneres, Alexander Gould, Willem Dafoe, Brad Garrett, Allison Janney, Stephen Root, Austin Pendleton, Vicki Lewis, Joe Ranft, Geoffrey Rush, Andrew Stanton, Elizabeth Perkins, Nicholas Bird, Bob Peterson, Barry Humphries, Eric Bana, Bruce Spence, Bill Hunter, Erik Per Sullivan, John Ratzenberger, Carlos Alazraqui, Jack Angel, Bob Bergen, Susan Blu, Jane Carr, Jennifer Darling, Paul Eiding, Jessie Flower, Bradley Trevor Greive, Jess Harnell, Sherry Lynn, Danny Mann, Mickie McGowan, Marc John Jefferies, Laura Marano, Vanessa Marano, Laraine Newman, Jeff Pidgeon, Phil Proctor, Jan Rabson, Daryl Sabara, Eve Sabara, David Ian Salter, Eliza Schneider, Lee Unkrich, James Kevin Ward, Kali Whitehurst	
M A Y	30	The Italian Job	Paramount Pictures	F. Gary Gray (director); Donna Powers, Wayne Powers (screenplay); Mark Wahlberg, Charlize Theron, Edward Norton, Seth Green, Jason Statham, Mos Def, Franky G, Donald Sutherland, Olek Krupa, Boris Lee Krutonog, Jimmy Shubert, Shawn Fanning, Scott Adsit, Oscar Nuñez, Aaron Speiser, Gregory Scott Cummins, Kelly Brook	
M A Y	30	Wrong Turn	20th Century Fox / Regency Enterprises	Rob Schmidt (director); Alan B. McElroy (screenplay); Desmond Harrington, Eliza Dushku, Emmanuelle Chriqui, Jeremy Sisto, Lindy Booth, Kevin Zegers, Julian Richings, Garry Robbins, Wayne Robson, David Huband, Ted Clark, Yvonne Gaudry, Joel Harris, James Downing	
J U N E	3	The Animatrix	Warner Home Video / Village Roadshow Pictures / Silver Pictures / Square Pictures / Studio 4°C / Madhouse / DNA Productions	Kōji Morimoto, Shinichiro Watanabe, Mahiro Maeda, Peter Chung, Yoshiaki Kawajiri (directors/screenplay); Andy Jones, Takeshi Koike (directors); The Wachowskis (screenplay); Hedy Burress, James Arnold Taylor, Clayton Watson, Julia Fletcher, Kevin Michael Richardson, Pamela Adlon, Keanu Reeves, Carrie-Anne Moss, Matt McKenzie, John DiMaggio, Tara Strong, Dwight Schultz, Victor Williams, Melinda Clarke, Olivia d'Abo	
J U N E	6	2 Fast 2 Furious	Universal Pictures	John Singleton (director); Michael Brandt, Derek Haas (screenplay); Paul Walker, Tyrese Gibson, Eva Mendes, Cole Hauser, Chris 'Ludacris' Bridges, Devon Aoki, Drew Sidora, James Remar, Thom Barry, Mark Boone Junior, Mo Gallini, MC Jin, Amaury Nolasco, Michael Ealy, Eric Etebari, Neal H. Moritz, Roberto Sanchez, John Cenatiempo	
J U N E	6	Love the Hard Way	Vine International Pictures	Peter Sehr (director); Adrien Brody, Charlotte Ayanna	
J U N E	13	Dumb and Dumberer: When Harry Met Lloyd	New Line Cinema	Troy Miller (director/screenplay); Brad Krevoy, Mark Burg, Oren Koules, Toby Emmerich (screenplay); Eric Christian Olsen, Derek Richardson, Cheri Oteri, Luis Guzmán, Elden Henson, William Lee Scott, Mimi Rogers, Eugene Levy, Rachel Nichols, Bob Saget, Julia Duffy, Elden Henson, Shia LaBeouf, Michelle Krusiec, Josh Braaten, Teal Redmann, Lin Shaye, Julie Costello, Shawnie Costello, Timothy Stack, Brian Posehn	
J U N E	13	Hollywood Homicide	Columbia Pictures / Revolution Studios	Ron Shelton (director/screenplay); Robert Souza (screenplay); Harrison Ford, Josh Hartnett, Lena Olin, Bruce Greenwood, Isaiah Washington, Lolita Davidovich, Keith David, Master P, Gladys Knight, Lou Diamond Phillips, Meredith Scott Lynn, Tom Todoroff, James MacDonald, Kurupt, Eric Idle, Andre Benjamin, Alan Dale, Dwight Yoakam, Martin Landau, Jennette McCurdy, Eloy Casados, Frank Sinatra, Jr., Robert Wagner, Anthony Mackie, Smokey Robinson	
J U N E	13	Rugrats Go Wild	Paramount Pictures / Nickelodeon Movies / Klasky Csupo	Norton Virgien, John Eng (directors); Kate Boutilier (screenplay); E.G. Daily, Nancy Cartwright, Kath Soucie, Dionne Quan, Cheryl Chase, Tim Curry, Lacey Chabert, Tara Strong, Cree Summer, Jack Riley, Melanie Chartoff, Joe Alaskey, Michael Bell, Julia Kato, Tress MacNeille, Phil Proctor, Tony Jay, Tom Kane, Flea, Danielle Harris, Jodi Carlisle, Bruce Willis, Chrissie Hynde, Ethan Phillips	
J U N E	20	Alex & Emma	Warner Bros. Pictures / Franchise Pictures	Rob Reiner (director); Jeremy Leven (screenplay); Kate Hudson, Luke Wilson, Sophie Marceau, David Paymer, Rob Reiner, Chino XL, Lobo Sebastian, Paul Willson, Rip Taylor, Jordan Lund, Robert Costanzo, Cloris Leachman, Alexander Wauthier, Leili Kramer, Gigi Bermingham, Francois Giroday, Earl Carroll	
J U N E	20	From Justin to Kelly	20th Century Fox	Robert Iscove (director); Kim Fuller (screenplay); Kelly Clarkson, Justin Guarini, Katherine Bailess, Anika Noni Rose, Brian Dietzen, Greg Siff, Jason Yribar, Christopher Bryan, Theresa San-Nicholas, Justin Gorence, Kaitlin Riley, Marc Macaulay, Jessica Sutta, Zachary Woodlee, Robert Hoffman	
J U N E	20	Hulk	Universal Pictures / Marvel Enterprises / Valhalla Motion Pictures	Ang Lee (director); James Schamus, Michael France, John Turman (screenplay); Eric Bana, Jennifer Connelly, Sam Elliott, Nick Nolte, Josh Lucas, Cara Buono, Celia Weston, Kevin Rankin, Stan Lee, Lou Ferrigno, Johnny Kastl, Daniel Dae Kim	
J U N E	24	Air Bud: Spikes Back	Buena Vista Home Entertainment / Keystone Family Pictures	Mike Southon (director); Anne Vince, Anna McRoberts (screenplay); Katija Pevec, Edie McClurg, Patrick Cranshaw, Cynthia Stevenson, Gabrielle Reece, Robert Tinkler, Alf Humphreys, Chantal Strand, C. Ernst Harth, Nancy Robertson, Brian Dobson, Jared Van Snellenberg, Tyler Boissonnault, Jake D. Smith, Malcolm Scott, Xantha Radley, Ellen Kennedy, Doug Funk	
J U N E	27	Charlie's Angels: Full Throttle	Columbia Pictures	McG (director); John August, Cormac and Marianne Wibberley (screenplay); Cameron Diaz, Drew Barrymore, Lucy Liu, Demi Moore, Bernie Mac, Crispin Glover, Justin Theroux, Robert Patrick, John Forsythe, Matt LeBlanc, Luke Wilson, John Cleese, Rodrigo Santoro, Shia LaBeouf, Ja'net Dubois, Cheung-Yan Yuen, Jaclyn Smith, Bruce Willis, Carrie Fisher, Pink, Carey Hart, Jeremy McGrath, Mary-Kate and Ashley Olsen, Eve, Ricky Carmichael, Ed Robertson, Robert Forster, Melissa McCarthy, Chris Pontius, Bam Margera, Bela Karolyi, Big Boy, Anthony Griffith, Eric Bogosian, Tommy Flanagan, Jonas Barnes, Luke Massy, Michael Guarnera, Andrew Wilson, Guy Oseary, Zack Shada, Wayne Federman, Steve Hytner, Marc John Jefferies, Bob Stephenson, Sven-Ole Thorsen, Zach Woodlee, The Pussycat Dolls, Bill Murray	
J U N E	27	On Line	Metro-Goldwyn-Mayer	Jed Weintrob (director/screenplay); Andrew Osborne (screenplay); Josh Hamilton, Harold Perrineau, Isabel Gillies, John Fleck, Vanessa Ferlito, Eric Millegan, James Badge Dale, Ali Farahnakian, Monique Coleman, Ari Gold	
J U N E	27	The Room	Chloe Productions / TPW Films	Tommy Wiseau (director); Tommy Wiseau, Greg Sestero, Juliette Danielle, Philip Haldiman, Carolyn Minnott	

== July–September ==
Opening		Title	Production company	Cast and crew	Ref.
J U L Y	2	Legally Blonde 2: Red, White & Blonde	Metro-Goldwyn-Mayer	Charles Herman-Wurmfeld (director); Kate Kondell (screenplay); Reese Witherspoon, Sally Field, Regina King, Jennifer Coolidge, Bruce McGill, Bob Newhart, Luke Wilson, Dana Ivey, Jessica Cauffiel, Alanna Ubach, Bruce Thomas, Mary Lynn Rajskub, J. Barton, Stanley Anderson, Ruth Williamson, Jack McGee, Amir Talai, Sam Pancake, Octavia Spencer, James Urbaniak, Lauren Cohn, Robert Peters, Jackie Hoffman, JoBe Cerny, Carolyn Hennesy, Erin Cottrell, Keone Young, James Read, Tane McClure, Moondoggie, Desi Lydic, Tanja Reichert, Sarah Shahi, Masi Oka	
J U L Y	2	Sinbad: Legend of the Seven Seas	DreamWorks	Tim Johnson, Patrick Gilmore (directors); John Logan (screenplay); Brad Pitt, Catherine Zeta-Jones, Michelle Pfeiffer, Joseph Fiennes, Dennis Haysbert, Adriano Giannini, Timothy West, Jim Cummings, Conrad Vernon, Raman Hui, Chris Miller, Frank Welker, Chung Chan, Andrew Birch	
J U L Y	2	Terminator 3: Rise of the Machines	Warner Bros. Pictures / Intermedia / C2 Pictures	Jonathan Mostow (director); John Brancato, Michael Ferris (screenplay); Arnold Schwarzenegger, Nick Stahl, Claire Danes, Kristanna Loken, David Andrews, Mark Famiglietti, Earl Boen, Jay Acovone, Moira Harris, Christopher Lawford, Carolyn Hennesy, M.C. Gainey, Elizabeth Morehead, Brian Sites, Larry McCormick, Michael Papajohn, Jon Foster, Matt Gerald, William O'Leary, Rick Zieff, Chris Hardwick, Kim Robillard, Mark Hicks, Billy D. Lucas	
J U L Y	9	Pirates of the Caribbean: The Curse of the Black Pearl	Walt Disney Pictures / Jerry Bruckheimer Films	Gore Verbinski (director); Ted Elliott, Terry Rossio (screenplay); Johnny Depp, Geoffrey Rush, Orlando Bloom, Keira Knightley, Jonathan Pryce, Jack Davenport, Kevin R. McNally, Zoe Saldaña, Treva Etienne, David Bailie, Lee Arenberg, Mackenzie Crook, Trevor Goddard, Isaac C. Singleton Jr., Michael Berry Jr., Martin Klebba, Damian O'Hare, Greg Ellis, Giles New, Angus Barnett, Guy Siner, Dylan Smith, Lucinda Dryzek, Luke de Woolfson, Matthew Bowyer, Vanessa Branch, Brye Cooper, Vince Lozano, Lauren Maher	
J U L Y	11	The League of Extraordinary Gentlemen	20th Century Fox	Stephen Norrington (director); James Dale Robinson (screenplay); Sean Connery, Naseeruddin Shah, Peta Wilson, Tony Curran, Stuart Townsend, Shane West, Jason Flemyng, Richard Roxburgh, Max Ryan, Tom Goodman-Hill, David Hemmings, Terry O'Neill	
J U L Y	11	Northfork	Paramount Classics	Michael Polish (director/screenplay); Mark Polish (screenplay); Peter Coyote, Anthony Edwards, Claire Forlani, Daryl Hannah, Kyle MacLachlan, Nick Nolte, Mark Polish, James Woods, Duel Farnes, Michele Hicks, Jon Gries, Robin Sachs, Ben Foster, Rick Overton, Graham Beckel, Marshall Bell, Steve Kramer, Clark Gregg, Douglas Sebern, Josh Barker	
J U L Y	15	The Hitcher II: I've Been Waiting	Universal Studios Home Video	Louis Morneau (director); Molly Meeker, Charles R. Meeker, Leslie Scharf (screenplay); C. Thomas Howell, Kari Wuhrer, Jake Busey, Shaun Johnston, Duncan Fraser, Mackenzie Gray, Janne Mortil, Steve Railsback	
J U L Y	18	Bad Boys II	Columbia Pictures / Jerry Bruckheimer Films	Michael Bay (director); Ron Shelton, Jerry Stahl (screenplay); Martin Lawrence, Will Smith, Gabrielle Union, Jordi Mollà, Peter Stormare, Theresa Randle, Joe Pantoliano, Otto Sanchez, Jon Seda, Oleg Taktarov, Michael Shannon, Jason Manuel Olazabal, Yul Vazquez, Treva Etienne, Kiko Ellsworth, Timothy Adams, Henry Rollins, Ivelin Giro, Dennis Greene, John Salley, Dan Marino	
J U L Y	18	How to Deal	New Line Cinema	Clare Kilner (director); Neena Beber (screenplay); Mandy Moore, Allison Janney, Trent Ford, Alexandra Holden, Dylan Baker, Nina Foch, Peter Gallagher, Mackenzie Astin, Connie Ray, Mary Garrison, Sonja Smits, Laura Catalano, Ray Kahnert, Andrew Gillies, John White, Alison MacLeod, Bill Lake, Charlotte Sullivan, Philip Akin, Ennis Esmer	
J U L Y	18	Johnny English	Universal Pictures / StudioCanal / Working Title Films	Peter Howitt (director); Neal Purvis, Robert Wade, William Davies (screenplay); Rowan Atkinson, John Malkovich, Ben Miller, Natalie Imbruglia, Oliver Ford Davies, Tim Pigott-Smith, Kevin McNally, Douglas McFerran, Steve Nicolson, Greg Wise, Tim Berrington, Prunella Scales, Tasha de Vasconcelos, Nina Young, Sam Beazley, Jenny Galloway, Chris Tarrant, Trevor McDonald	
J U L Y	24	Masked and Anonymous	Sony Pictures Classics / Intermedia Films / BBC Films	Larry Charles (director/screenplay); Bob Dylan (screenplay); Bob Dylan, Jeff Bridges, John Goodman, Penélope Cruz, Luke Wilson, Jessica Lange, Angela Bassett, Steven Bauer, Michael Paul Chan, Bruce Dern, Ed Harris, Val Kilmer, Cheech Marin, Chris Penn, Giovanni Ribisi, Mickey Rourke, Richard C. Sarafian, Christian Slater, Susan Tyrrell, Fred Ward, Robert Ray Wisdom, Tony Garnier, Larry Campbell, Charlie Sexton, Alex Désert, Treva Etienne, Dan Frischman, Eddie Gorodetsky, Noel Gugliemi, Shawn Michael Howard, Tinashe, Reggie Lee, Sam Sarpong, Susan Traylor, Tracey Walter	
J U L Y	25	Hotel	Metro-Goldwyn-Mayer / United Artists / Moonstone Entertainment / Channel 4	Mike Figgis (director/screenplay); Heathcote Williams (screenplay); Rhys Ifans, David Schwimmer, Salma Hayek, Lucy Liu, Burt Reynolds, Saffron Burrows, Max Beesley, John Malkovich, Julian Sands, Danny Huston, Valentina Cervi, Chiara Mastroianni, Andrea Di Stefano, Mark Strong, Danny Sapani, Ornella Muti, Laura Morante, Fabrizio Bentivoglio, Brian Bovell, Elisabetta Cavallotti, George DiCenzo, Christopher Fulford, Valeria Golino, Jeremy Hardy, Jason Isaacs, Mia Maestro, Stefania Rocca, Heathcote Williams	
J U L Y	25	Lara Croft: Tomb Raider – The Cradle of Life	Paramount Pictures / Mutual Film Company	Jan de Bont (director); Dean Georgaris (screenplay); Angelina Jolie, Gerard Butler, Ciarán Hinds, Chris Barrie, Noah Taylor, Djimon Hounsou, Til Schweiger, Simon Yam, Terence Yin	
J U L Y	25	Seabiscuit	Universal Pictures / DreamWorks / Spyglass Entertainment	Gary Ross (director/screenplay); Tobey Maguire, Jeff Bridges, Chris Cooper, Elizabeth Banks, Gary Stevens, William H. Macy, Eddie Jones, Michael Ensign, James Keane, Valerie Mahaffey, Michael O'Neill, Annie Corley, Michael Angarano, Ed Lauter, Gianni Russo, Sam Bottoms, Royce D. Applegate, Michelle Arthur, Danny Strong, Camillia Sanes, Shay Duffin, Peter Jason, Chris McCarron, Michael B. Silver, Richard Reeves, Gary Ross, Pat Skipper	
J U L Y	25	Spy Kids 3-D: Game Over	Dimension Films / Troublemaker Studios	Robert Rodriguez (director/screenplay); Antonio Banderas, Carla Gugino, Alexa Vega, Daryl Sabara, Ricardo Montalbán, Holland Taylor, Sylvester Stallone, Mike Judge, Salma Hayek, Matt O'Leary, Emily Osment, Ryan Pinkston, Robert Vito, Bobby Edner, Courtney Jines, Cheech Marin, Danny Trejo, Alan Cumming, Tony Shalhoub, Steve Buscemi, Bill Paxton, George Clooney, Elijah Wood, Selena Gomez, Glen Powell, James Paxton	
J U L Y	26	Undefeated	HBO Films	John Leguizamo (director/screenplay); Frank Pugliese (screenplay); John Leguizamo, Clifton Collins Jr., Adrian Martinez, Juan Carlos Hernández, Nestor Serrano, Coati Mundi, David Zayas, Guillermo Díaz, Omar Benson Miller, Tony Touch, Vanessa Ferlito, Robert Montano, Robert Forster, Larry Merchant, Jim Lampley, Kim Matulova, Will Arnett, Mike Francesa, Christopher "Mad Dog' Russo, Kamar de los Reyes	
A U G U S T	1	American Wedding	Universal Pictures	Jesse Dylan (director); Adam Herz (screenplay); Jason Biggs, Seann William Scott, Alyson Hannigan, Eddie Kaye Thomas, Thomas Ian Nicholas, Eugene Levy, Molly Cheek, Angela Paton, Fred Willard, Deborah Rush, January Jones, Eric Allan Kramer, Amanda Swisten, Nikki Schieler Ziering, Lawrence Pressman, Reynaldo Gallegos, Loren Lester, Justin Isfeld, John Cho, Willam Belli, Jennifer Coolidge, Julie Payne, David St. James	
A U G U S T	1	Gigli	Columbia Pictures / Revolution Studios / City Light Films / Casey Silver Productions	Martin Brest (director/screenplay); Ben Affleck, Jennifer Lopez, Justin Bartha, Al Pacino, Christopher Walken, Lainie Kazan, Lenny Venito, Missy Crider, Terrence Camilleri	
A U G U S T	1	The Secret Lives of Dentists	Arclight Films / Hole Digger Films	Alan Rudolph (director); Craig Lucas (screenplay); Campbell Scott, Hope Davis, Denis Leary, Robin Tunney, Lydia Jordan, Kate Clinton, Susie Essman, Peter Samuel, Jon Patrick Walker, Gianna Belano, Cassidy Hinkle, Adele D'man	
A U G U S T	6	Freaky Friday	Walt Disney Pictures	Mark Waters (director); Heather Hach, Leslie Dixon (screenplay); Jamie Lee Curtis, Lindsay Lohan, Mark Harmon, Harold Gould, Chad Michael Murray, Stephen Tobolowsky, Christina Vidal, Ryan Malgarini, Haley Hudson, Rosalind Chao, Lucille Soong, Willie Garson, Dina Waters, Julie Gonzalo, Cayden Boyd, Christopher Guest, Marc McClure, Mary Ellen Trainor, Erica Gimpel, Heather Hach	
A U G U S T	8	Le Divorce	Fox Searchlight Pictures	James Ivory (director/screenplay); Ruth Prawer Jhabvala (screenplay); Kate Hudson, Naomi Watts, Glenn Close, Leslie Caron, Marie-Christine Adam, Thierry Lhermitte, Melvil Poupaud, Romain Duris, Stockard Channing, Sam Waterston, Jean-Marc Barr, Bebe Neuwirth, Matthew Modine, Thomas Lennon, Catherine Samie, Esmee Buchet-Deak, Samuel Labarthe, Nathalie Richard, Rona Hartner, Stephen Fry, Peter Wyckoff	
A U G U S T	8	Step into Liquid	Artisan Entertainment	Dana Brown (director)	
A U G U S T	8	S.W.A.T.	Columbia Pictures / Original Film	Clark Johnson (director); David Ayer, David McKenna (screenplay); Samuel L. Jackson, Colin Farrell, Michelle Rodriguez, LL Cool J, Josh Charles, Jeremy Renner, Brian Van Holt, Olivier Martinez, Reginald E. Cathey, Larry Poindexter, Page Kennedy, Domenick Lombardozzi, Denis Arndt, Lindsey Ginter, Lucinda Jenney, E. Roger Mitchell, Jay Acovone, J. Grant Albrecht, Esther K. Chae, Kenneth Davitian, Reed Diamond, Jamal Duff, Colin Egglesfield, Steve Forrest, Willie Gault, Matt Gerald, Bruce Gray, Michael Gregory, Noel Gugliemi, Clark Johnson, Archbishop Don "Magic" Juan, Benjamin King, Jenya Lano, Larry McCormick, Neal H. Moritz, Michael Papajohn, Devika Parikh, Rod Perry, Ashley Scott, Octavia L. Spencer, Gregory Sporleder, Richard Steinmetz, David St. James, Shannon Sturges, Andy Umberger, Jeffrey Wincott, Philip Akin, Duane Davis, Andre Gordon, Sergio Kato, Leonard L. Thomas	
A U G U S T	15	American Splendor	Fine Line Features / HBO Films	Shari Springer Berman and Robert Pulcini (directors/screenplay); Paul Giamatti, Hope Davis, Judah Friedlander, Donal Logue, Molly Shannon, James Urbaniak, Harvey Pekar, Joyce Brabner, Toby Radloff, Earl Billings, Maggie Moore, James McCaffrey, Madylin Sweeten, Gary Dumm, Eytan Mirsky, Josh Hutcherson, Chris Ambrose, Shari Springer Berman, Robert Pulcini, Daniel Tay	
A U G U S T	15	Freddy vs. Jason	New Line Cinema	Ronny Yu (director); Damian Shannon, Mark Swift (screenplay); Robert Englund, Ken Kirzinger, Monica Keena, Kelly Rowland, Jason Ritter, Christopher Marquette, Lochlyn Munro, Katharine Isabelle, Kyle Labine, Tom Butler, Zack Ward, Garry Chalk, Jesse Hutch, Chris Gauthier, Paula Shaw, David Kopp, Odessa Munroe, Sharon Peters	
A U G U S T	15	Grind	Warner Bros. Pictures	Casey La Scala (director); Ralph Sall (screenplay); Mike Vogel, Adam Brody, Vince Vieluf, Joey Kern, Jennifer Morrison, Jason London, Summer Altice, Bam Margera, Erin Murphy, Stephen Root, Christopher McDonald, Brian Posehn, Jason Acuna, Christine Estabrook, Randy Quaid, Lindsay Felton, Ehren McGhehey, Brandon Mychal Smith, Bob "Bobcat" Goldthwait, Tom Green, Ryan Sheckler, Guillermo Aguilar, Preston Lacy, Liam Booth	
A U G U S T	15	Open Range	Touchstone Pictures	Kevin Costner (director); Craig Storper, Lauran Paine (screenplay); Robert Duvall, Kevin Costner, Annette Bening, Michael Gambon, Michael Jeter, Diego Luna, James Russo, Abraham Benrubi, Dean McDermott, Kim Coates, Herbert Kohler Jr., Peter MacNeill, Julian Richings, Ian Tracey, Cliff Saunders, Patricia Stutz, Rod Wilson	
A U G U S T	15	Passionada	Samuel Goldwyn Films	Dan Ireland (director); David Bakalar, Jim Jermanok, Steve Jermanok (screenplay); Jason Isaacs, Sofia Milos, Emmy Rossum, Theresa Russell, Seymour Cassel, Lupe Ontiveros, Chris Tardio, Benjamin Mouton, Bill Burr, Robert Montano, Luis Colina, Russ Vigilante, Anthero Montenegro	
A U G U S T	15	Uptown Girls	Metro-Goldwyn-Mayer	Boaz Yakin (director); Julia Dahl, Mo Ogrodnik, Lisa Davidowitz, Allison Jacobs (screenplay); Brittany Murphy, Dakota Fanning, Marley Shelton, Donald Faison, Heather Locklear, Jesse Spencer, Austin Pendleton, Pell James, Marceline Hugot, Fisher Stevens, Brian Friedman, Lucy Saroyan, Nas, Carmen Electra, Mark McGrath, Dave Navarro, Duncan Sheik, Benjamin Quddus Philippe, Edward Hibbert, Reed Birney, Polly Adams, Martin Shakar, A.D. Miles, Anthony J. Ribustello, Alex McCord, Michael Urie, Wynter Kullman, Amy Korb	
A U G U S T	20	Thirteen	Fox Searchlight Pictures / Working Title Films	Catherine Hardwicke (director/screenplay); Nikki Reed (screenplay); Holly Hunter, Evan Rachel Wood, Nikki Reed, Jeremy Sisto, Brady Corbet, Deborah Kara Unger, Kip Pardue, Sarah Clarke, D. W. Moffett, Vanessa Anne Hudgens, Jenicka Carey, Ulysses Estrada, Sarah Blakely-Cartwright, Jasmine Di Angelo, Tessa Ludwick, Cynthia Ettinger, Charles Duckworth	
A U G U S T	22	The Battle of Shaker Heights	Miramax Films	Efram Potelle, Kyle Rankin (directors); Erica Beeney (screenplay); Shia LaBeouf, Elden Henson, Amy Smart, Shiri Appleby, Kathleen Quinlan, William Sadler, Ray Wise, Dana Wheeler-Nicholson, Billy Kay, Michael McShane, Anson Mount, Hattie Wilson	
A U G U S T	22	Marci X	Paramount Pictures	Richard Benjamin (director); Paul Rudnick (screenplay); Lisa Kudrow, Damon Wayans, Richard Benjamin, Christine Baranski, Paula Garces, Andrew Keenan-Bolger, Charles Kimbrough, Jane Krakowski, Veanne Cox, Sherie Rene Scott, Matthew Morrison, NaShawn Kearse, Gerry Becker, Bruce Altman, Walter Bobbie, Mustafa Shakir, Kaity Tong, Jim Watkins, Mary Murphy, Mary Hart, Hassan Johnson, Queen Esther, Dean Edwards, Erik LaRay Harvey, Zachary Tyler, Billy Griffith	
A U G U S T	22	My Boss's Daughter	Dimension Films	David Zucker (director); David S. Dorfman (screenplay); Ashton Kutcher, Tara Reid, Andy Richter, Jeffrey Tambor, Terence Stamp, Molly Shannon, Michael Madsen, Tyler Labine, Jon Abrahams, Patrick Crenshaw, Angela Little, David Koechner, Carmen Electra, Kenan Thompson, Dave Foley, Charlotte Zucker	
A U G U S T	22	Stoked: The Rise and Fall of Gator	Palm Pictures	Helen Stickler (director);	
A U G U S T	26	Stitch! The Movie	Walt Disney Home Entertainment	Tony Craig (director); Roberts Gannaway (director/screenplay); Jess Winfield (screenplay); Chris Sanders, Daveigh Chase, Tia Carrere, David Ogden Stiers, Kevin McDonald, Ving Rhames, Dee Bradley Baker, Kevin Michael Richardson, Jeff Bennett, Corey Burton, Zoe Caldwell, Tress MacNeille, Liliana Mumy, Rob Paulsen, Frank Welker, Jess Winfield, Kali Whitehurst, Kunewa Mook, Lili Ishida, Jillian Henry	
A U G U S T	29	Jeepers Creepers 2	United Artists / American Zoetrope / Myriad Pictures	Victor Salva (director/screenplay); Jonathan Breck, Ray Wise, Luke Edwards, Garikayi Mutambirwa, Nicki Aycox, Eric Nenninger, Travis Schiffner, Marieh Delfino, Billy Aaron Brown, Lena Cardwell, Josh Hammond, Al Santos, Kasan Butcher, Drew Tyler Bell, Diane Delano, Thom Gossom, Jr., Tom Tarantini, Shaun Fleming, Justin Long	
S E P T E M B E R	5	Dickie Roberts: Former Child Star	Paramount Pictures	Sam Weisman (director); David Spade, Fred Wolf (screenplay); David Spade, Mary McCormack, Jon Lovitz, Craig Bierko, Alyssa Milano, Rob Reiner, Scott Terra, Jenna Boyd, Leif Garrett, Doris Roberts, Emmanuel Lewis, Tom Arnold, Barry Williams, Danny Bonaduce, Corey Feldman, Brendan Fraser, Dick Van Patten, Sasha Mitchell, Dustin Diamond, Florence Henderson, Rachel Dratch, Aerosmith, Butch Patrick, Gary Coleman, Maureen McCormick, Todd Bridges, Christopher Knight, Michael Buffer, Corey Haim, Fred Berry, Peter Dante, Jeff Conaway, Erin Moran, Jay North, Jonathan Loughran, Tony Dow, Barry Livingston, Adam Rich, Eddie Mekka, Ron Palillo, Jeremy Miller, Haywood Nelson, Rodney Allen Rippy, Marion Ross, Ernest Lee Thomas, Charlene Tilton, Jay Leno, David Soul, Joey Diaz	
S E P T E M B E R	5	The Order	20th Century Fox	Brian Helgeland (director/screenplay); Heath Ledger, Shannyn Sossamon, Benno Fürmann, Mark Addy, Peter Weller, Francesco Carnelutti, Adam Toomer	
S E P T E M B E R	5	Party Monster	Strand Releasing	Fenton Bailey, Randy Barbato (directors/screenplay); Macaulay Culkin, Seth Green, Chloë Sevigny, Diana Scarwid, Dylan McDermott, Justin Hagan, Wilson Cruz, Wilmer Valderrama, Marilyn Manson, Mia Kirshner, Daniel Franzese, Natasha Lyonne, John Stamos, Amanda Lepore, Richie Rich, Armen Ra	
S E P T E M B E R	7	And Starring Pancho Villa as Himself	HBO Films	Bruce Beresford (director); Larry Gelbart (screenplay); Antonio Banderas, Eion Bailey, Alan Arkin, Jim Broadbent, Matt Day, Kyle Chandler, Michael McKean, Colm Feore, Alexa Davalos, Anthony Stewart Head, Saul Rubinek, Damián Alcázar, Pedro Armendáriz, Jr.	
S E P T E M B E R	12	Cabin Fever	Lions Gate Films	Eli Roth (director/screenplay); Randy Pearlstein (screenplay); Rider Strong, Jordan Ladd, James DeBello, Cerina Vincent, Joey Kern, Arie Verveen, Giuseppe Andrews, Jeff Hoffman, Eli Roth	
S E P T E M B E R	12	Dummy	Artisan Entertainment	Greg Pritikin (director/screenplay); Adrien Brody, Milla Jovovich, Illeana Douglas, Vera Farmiga, Jared Harris, Jessica Walter, Ron Leibman, Helen Hanft, Lawrence Leritz, Poppi Kramer, Mirabella Pisani, Alan Semok	
S E P T E M B E R	12	Matchstick Men	Warner Bros. Pictures / ImageMovers / Scott Free Productions	Ridley Scott (director/screenplay); Steve Starkey, Sean Bailey, Jack Rapke, Ted Griffin (screenplay); Nicolas Cage, Sam Rockwell, Alison Lohman, Bruce Altman, Bruce McGill, Sheila Kelley, Beth Grant, Melora Walters, Jenny O'Hara, Steve Eastin, Fran Kranz, Tim Kelleher, Tim Maculan, Giannina Facio, Sonya Eddy, Jim Zulevic	
S E P T E M B E R	12	Lost in Translation	Focus Features	Sofia Coppola (director/screenplay); Bill Murray, Scarlett Johansson, Giovanni Ribisi, Anna Faris	
S E P T E M B E R	12	Once Upon a Time in Mexico	Columbia Pictures / Dimension Films / Troublemaker Studios	Robert Rodriguez (director/screenplay); Antonio Banderas, Salma Hayek, Johnny Depp, Mickey Rourke, Eva Mendes, Danny Trejo, Enrique Iglesias, Marco Leonardi, Cheech Marin, Julio Oscar Mechoso, Rubén Blades, Willem Dafoe	
S E P T E M B E R	19	Anything Else	DreamWorks	Woody Allen (director/screenplay); Jason Biggs, Christina Ricci, Woody Allen, Stockard Channing, Danny DeVito, Jimmy Fallon, Erica Leerhsen, KaDee Strickland, David Conrad	
S E P T E M B E R	19	Cold Creek Manor	Touchstone Pictures	Mike Figgis (director); Richard Jefferies (screenplay); Dennis Quaid, Sharon Stone, Stephen Dorff, Juliette Lewis, Kristen Stewart, Ryan Wilson, Dana Eskelson, Christopher Plummer, Paula Brancati, Aidan Devine, Wayne Robson, Peter Outerbridge, Leslie Dilley, George Buza, Daniel Kash, Stephanie Morgenstern, Raoul Bhaneja	
S E P T E M B E R	19	The Fighting Temptations	Paramount Pictures / MTV Films	Jonathan Lynn (director); Elizabeth Hunter, Saladin K. Patterson (screenplay); Cuba Gooding Jr., Beyoncé Knowles, Mike Epps, Steve Harvey, LaTanya Richardson, Wendell Pierce, Ann Nesby, Lourdes Benedicto, Dakin Matthews, T-Bone, Montell Jordan, Lou Myers, Angie Stone, Melba Moore, Mitchah Williams, Mickey Jones, Dave Sheridan, Rue McClanahan, Lil Zane, Mae Middleton, Eddie Levert, Walter Williams, Eric Nolan Grant, Darrell Vanterpool, Faizon Love, Faith Evans, James E. Gaines, Wilbur Fitzgerald, Chris Cole, Shirley Caesar, The Blind Boys of Alabama, Mary Mary, Ramiyah, Donnie McClurkin, Yolanda Adams, Daphne Duplaix	
S E P T E M B E R	19	Secondhand Lions	New Line Cinema	Tim McCanlies (director/screenplay); Michael Caine, Robert Duvall, Haley Joel Osment, Kyra Sedgwick, Nicky Katt, Josh Lucas, Michael O'Neill, Deirdre O'Connell, Christian Kane, Eric Balfour, Emmanuelle Vaugier, Adrian Pasdar, Mitchel Musso, Marc Russo, Jennifer Stone, Adam Ozturk	
S E P T E M B E R	19	Underworld	Screen Gems / Lakeshore Entertainment	Len Wiseman (director); Danny McBride (screenplay); Kate Beckinsale, Scott Speedman, Michael Sheen, Bill Nighy, Shane Brolly, Erwin Leder, Sophia Myles, Robbie Gee, Kevin Grevioux, Zita Görög, Wentworth Miller, Jázmin Dammak, Scott McElroy, Dennis Kozeluh, Hank Amos, Sandor Bolla, Todd Schneider	
S E P T E M B E R	26	Duplex	Miramax Films	Danny DeVito (director); Larry Doyle (screenplay); Ben Stiller, Drew Barrymore, Eileen Essell, Harvey Fierstein, Justin Theroux, James Remar, Robert Ray Wisdom, Swoosie Kurtz, Wallace Shawn, Maya Rudolph, Amber Valletta, Michelle Krusiec, Tracey Walter, Danny DeVito	
S E P T E M B E R	26	The Rundown	Universal Pictures / Columbia Pictures	Peter Berg (director); R.J. Stewart, James Vanderbilt (screenplay); Dwayne "The Rock" Johnson, Seann William Scott, Christopher Walken, Rosario Dawson, Ewen Bremner, Jon Gries, Ernie Reyes, Jr., William Lucking, Antonio Muñoz, Stephen Bishop, Arnold Schwarzenegger	
S E P T E M B E R	26	Under the Tuscan Sun	Touchstone Pictures	Audrey Wells (director/screenplay); Diane Lane, Sandra Oh, Lindsay Duncan, Raoul Bova, Vincent Riotta, Roberto Nobile, Anita Zagaria, Evelina Gori, Kate Walsh, Pawel Szajda, David Sutcliffe, Jeffrey Tambor, Valentine Pelka, Claudia Gerini, Matt Salinger, Elden Henson, Dan Bucatinsky, Giulia Steigerwalt, Sasa Vulicevic, Massimo Sarchielli, Laura Pestellini, Don McManus, Jack Kehler, Kristoffer Ryan Winters, Nuccio Siano	
S E P T E M B E R	30	Scooby-Doo! and the Monster of Mexico	Warner Home Video / Warner Bros. Animation	Scott Jeralds (director); Douglas Wood (screenplay); Frank Welker, Casey Kasem, Nicole Jaffe, Heather North, Eddie Santiago, Jesse Borrego, Candi Milo, Rita Moreno, Maria Canals-Barrera, Alanna Ubach, Rip Taylor, Castulo Guerra, Benito Martinez, Eric Loomis	

== October–December ==
Opening		Title	Production company	Cast and crew	Ref.
O C T O B E R	3	Out of Time	Metro-Goldwyn-Mayer	Carl Franklin (director); David Collard (screenplay); Denzel Washington, Eva Mendes, Sanaa Lathan, Dean Cain, John Billingsley, Robert Baker, Alex Carter, Antoni Corone, Terry Loughlin, Nora Dunn, James Murtaugh, O. L. Duke, Tom Hillmann	
O C T O B E R	3	School of Rock	Paramount Pictures	Richard Linklater (director); Mike White (screenplay); Jack Black, Joan Cusack, Mike White, Sarah Silverman, Miranda Cosgrove, Cole Hawkins, Jordan-Claire Green, Adam Pascal, Lucas Babin, Joey Gaydos Jr., Kevin Clark, Rebecca Brown, Robert Tsai, Maryam Hassan, Caitlin Hale, Aleisha Allen, Brian Falduto, Zachary Infante, James Hosey, Angelo Massagli, Veronica Afflerbach, Lucas Papaelias	
O C T O B E R	3	Wonderland	Lions Gate Films	James Cox (director/screenplay); Captain Mauzner, Todd Samovitz, D. Loriston Scott (screenplay); Val Kilmer, Kate Bosworth, Lisa Kudrow, Josh Lucas, Dylan McDermott, Carrie Fisher, Christina Applegate, Ted Levine, Tim Blake Nelson, Janeane Garofalo, Natasha Gregson Wagner, Faizon Love, M. C. Gainey, Joel Michaely, Franky G, Eric Bogosian, Paris Hilton, Scoot McNairy, John Holmes, Joleigh Pulsonetti	
O C T O B E R	10	Good Boy!	Metro-Goldwyn-Mayer	John Hoffman (director/screenplay); Zeke Richardson (screenplay); Liam Aiken, Matthew Broderick, Brittany Murphy, Donald Faison, Vanessa Redgrave, Cheech Marin, Carl Reiner, Delta Burke, Molly Shannon, Kevin Nealon, Brittany Moldowan, Hunter Elliott, Mikhael Speidel, Patti Allan, Benjamin Ratner, Peter Flemming, George Touliatos, D. Harlan Cutshall, Brenda M. Crichlow, Paul Vogt	
O C T O B E R	10	House of the Dead	Artisan Entertainment	Uwe Boll (director); Mark A. Altman, Dan Bates (screenplay); Jonathan Cherry, Tyron Leitso, Ona Grauer, Jürgen Prochnow, Ellie Cornell, Clint Howard, Enuka Okuma, Will Sanderson, Kira Clavell, Michael Eklund, David Palffy, Sonya Salomaa, Erica Durance, Adam Harrington, Colin Lawrence	
O C T O B E R	10	Intolerable Cruelty	Universal Pictures / Imagine Entertainment / Mike Zoss Productions	Joel Coen, Ethan Coen (directors/screenplay); Robert Ramsay, Matthew Stone (screenplay); George Clooney, Catherine Zeta-Jones, Geoffrey Rush, Cedric the Entertainer, Edward Herrmann, Richard Jenkins, Billy Bob Thornton, Paul Adelstein, Julia Duffy, Jonathan Hadary, Tom Aldredge, Stacey Travis, Irwin Keyes, Colin Linden, Kiersten Warren, Jack Kyle, Isabell O'Connor, Mia Cottet	
O C T O B E R	10	Kill Bill: Volume 1	Miramax Films	Quentin Tarantino (director/screenplay); Uma Thurman, Lucy Liu, Daryl Hannah, David Carradine, Michael Madsen, Vivica A. Fox, Julie Dreyfus, Sonny Chiba, Chiaki Kuriyama, Gordon Liu, Michael Parks, Michael Bowen, Jun Kunimura, Kenji Ohba, James Parks, Jonathan Loughran, Sakichi Sato, Shun Sugata, The 5.6.7.8's, Yuki Kazamatsuri, Ambrosia Kelley	
O C T O B E R	15	Mystic River	Warner Bros. Pictures / Village Roadshow Pictures	Clint Eastwood (director); Brian Helgeland (screenplay); Sean Penn, Tim Robbins, Kevin Bacon, Laurence Fishburne, Marcia Gay Harden, Laura Linney, Tom Guiry, Spencer Treat Clark, Emmy Rossum, Jenny O'Hara, Kevin Chapman, Robert Wahlberg, Cayden Boyd, John Doman, Jonathan Togo, Will Lyman, Ari Graynor, Ken Cheeseman, Kevin Conway, Eli Wallach, Connor Paolo, Andrew Mackin, Adam Nelson, Tori Davis, Michael McGovern, Jason Kelly, Cameron Bowen	
O C T O B E R	17	Pieces of April	United Artists	Peter Hedges (director/screenplay); Katie Holmes, Patricia Clarkson, Derek Luke, Sean Hayes, Oliver Platt, Alison Pill, John Gallagher Jr., Alice Drummond, Isiah Whitlock Jr., Lillias White, Leila Danette, Sisqo, Adrian Martinez, Armando Riesco	
O C T O B E R	17	Runaway Jury	20th Century Fox / Regency Enterprises	Gary Fleder (director); Brian Koppelman, David Levien, Rick Cleveland, Matthew Chapman (screenplay); John Cusack, Gene Hackman, Dustin Hoffman, Rachel Weisz, Bruce Davison, Bruce McGill, Jeremy Piven, Nick Searcy, Marguerite Moreau, Leland Orser, Lori Heuring, Nestor Serrano, Joanna Going, Cliff Curtis, Dylan McDermott	
O C T O B E R	17	The Texas Chainsaw Massacre	New Line Cinema / Platinum Dunes	Marcus Nispel (director); Scott Kosar (screenplay); Jessica Biel, Jonathan Tucker, Erica Leerhsen, Mike Vogel, Eric Balfour, Andrew Bryniarski, R. Lee Ermey, David Dorfman, Lauren German, Terrence Evans, Marietta Marich, Heather Kafka, Kathy Lamkin	
O C T O B E R	17	Veronica Guerin	Touchstone Pictures / Jerry Bruckheimer Films	Joel Schumacher (director); Carol Doyle, Mary Agnes Donoghue (screenplay); Cate Blanchett, Gerard McSorley, Ciarán Hinds, Brenda Fricker, Amy Shiels, Barry Barnes, Simon O'Driscoll, Don Wycherley, Alan Devine, Gerry O'Brien, Paul Ronan, Danielle Fox Clarke, Stephen O'Doherty, Laurence Kinlan, Colin Farrell	
O C T O B E R	22	In the Cut	Screen Gems	Jane Campion (director/screenplay); Susanna Moore (screenplay); Meg Ryan, Mark Ruffalo, Jennifer Jason Leigh, Nick Damici, Patrice O'Neal, Kevin Bacon	
O C T O B E R	24	Beyond Borders	Paramount Pictures / Mandalay Pictures	Martin Campbell (director); Caspian Tredwell-Owen (screenplay); Angelina Jolie, Clive Owen, Teri Polo, Kate Ashfield, Linus Roache, Noah Emmerich, Yorick van Wageningen, Timothy West, Iain Lee, Jamie Bartlett, Kate Trotter, Nambitha Mpumlwana, Burt Kwouk, Jasmin Geljo, Francis X. McCarthy, Manuel Tadros, Elizabeth Whitmere, John Matshikiza, Zaa Nkweta, Andrew French, Jonathan Higgins, John Gausden, Isabelle Horler, Keelan Anthony, John Bourgeois, Fikile Nyandeni, Tumisho Masha, Faye Peters, Doan Jaroen-Ngarm Mckenzie, Teerawat Mulvilai	
O C T O B E R	24	Radio	Columbia Pictures / Revolution Studios	Michael Tollin (director); Mike Rich (screenplay); Cuba Gooding Jr., Ed Harris, S. Epatha Merkerson, Alfre Woodard, Debra Winger, Riley Smith, Sarah Drew, Brent Sexton, Chris Mulkey, Patrick Breen	
O C T O B E R	24	Scary Movie 3	Dimension Films	David Zucker (director); Craig Mazin, Pat Proft (screenplay); Anna Faris, Anthony Anderson, Kevin Hart, Leslie Nielsen, Camryn Manheim, Simon Rex, George Carlin, Queen Latifah, Eddie Griffin, Denise Richards, Regina Hall, Charlie Sheen, Pamela Anderson, Jenny McCarthy, Drew Mikuska, D.L. Hughley, Ja Rule, Darrell Hammond, Jeremy Piven, Timothy Stack, Elaine Klimaszewski, Diane Klimaszewski, Frank C. Turner, Beverley Breuer, Simon Cowell, Marny Eng, Edward Moss, Ajay Naidu, Tom Kenny, Derek Stephen Prince, Master P, RZA, Raekwon, Method Man, Redman, Macy Gray, U-God, Fat Joe, Debbie Lee Carrington, Naomi Lawson-Baird, Jianna Ballard	
O C T O B E R	24	The Singing Detective	Paramount Classics / Icon Productions	Keith Gordon (director); Dennis Potter (screenplay); Robert Downey Jr., Robin Wright Penn, Jeremy Northam, Katie Holmes, Mel Gibson, Adrien Brody, Jon Polito, Carla Gugino, Saul Rubinek, Alfre Woodard, Amy Aquino, Eddie Jones, Clyde Kusatsu, David Dorfman	
O C T O B E R	24	The Human Stain	Miramax Films	Robert Benton (director); Nicholas Meyer (screenplay); Anthony Hopkins, Nicole Kidman, Ed Harris, Gary Sinise, Wentworth Miller, Jacinda Barrett, Mimi Kuzyk, Clark Gregg, Anna Deavere Smith, Phyllis Newman, Mili Avital, Harry Lennix, Tom Rack, Lizan Mitchell, Danny Blanco-Hall	
O C T O B E R	24	Shattered Glass	Lions Gate Films	Billy Ray (director/screenplay); Hayden Christensen, Peter Sarsgaard, Chloë Sevigny, Rosario Dawson, Melanie Lynskey, Hank Azaria, Steve Zahn, Mark Blum, Simone-Élise Girard, Chad Donella, Jamie Elman, Luke Kirby, Cas Anvar, Ted Kotcheff, Owen Rotharmel, Bill Rowat	
N O V E M B E R	1	Brother Bear	Walt Disney Pictures	Aaron Blaise, Robert Walker (directors); Tab Murphy, Lorne Cameron, David Hoselton, Steve Bencich, Ron J. Friedman (screenplay); Joaquin Phoenix, Jeremy Suarez, Rick Moranis, Dave Thomas, Jason Raize, D.B. Sweeney, Joan Copeland, Michael Clarke Duncan, Greg Proops, Pauley Perrette, Estelle Harris, Paul Christie, Danny Mastrogiorgio, Bumper Robinson, Angayuqaq Oscar Kawagley, Patrick Pinney, Bob Bergen, Rodger Bumpass, Roger Rose, Debi Derryberry, Phil Proctor, John Schwab, Bill Farmer, Pamela Adlon, Sherry Lynn, Darko Cesar, Randy Crenshaw, Hope Levy	
N O V E M B E R	5	The Matrix Revolutions	Warner Bros. Pictures / Village Roadshow Pictures / Silver Pictures	The Wachowskis (directors/screenplay); Keanu Reeves, Laurence Fishburne, Carrie-Anne Moss, Hugo Weaving, Jada Pinkett Smith, Mary Alice, Harold Perrineau, Monica Bellucci, Harry J. Lennix, Lambert Wilson, Nona Gaye, Anthony Zerbe, Nathaniel Lees, Collin Chou, Ian Bliss, Helmut Bakaitis, Tanveer K. Atwal, Bruce Spence, Gina Torres, Clayton Watson, Cornel West, Bernard White, David Roberts, Anthony Wong, Kevin Michael Richardson, Tharini Mudaliar, Henry Blasingame	
N O V E M B E R	7	Elf	New Line Cinema	Jon Favreau (director); David Berenbaum (screenplay); Will Ferrell, James Caan, Zooey Deschanel, Mary Steenburgen, Bob Newhart, Ed Asner, Daniel Tay, Faizon Love, Peter Dinklage, Amy Sedaris, Michael Lerner, Andy Richter, Kyle Gass, Artie Lange, Jon Favreau, Matt Walsh, Peter Billingsley, Mark Acheson, David Paul Grove, Leon Redbone, Ray Harryhausen, Maurice LaMarche, Dallas McKennon	
N O V E M B E R	7	Love Actually	Universal Pictures / StudioCanal / Working Title Films	Richard Curtis (director/screenplay); Alan Rickman, Bill Nighy, Colin Firth, Emma Thompson, Hugh Grant, Liam Neeson, Rowan Atkinson, Keira Knightley, Michael Parkinson, Martine McCutcheon, Ant & Dec, Sienna Guillory, Lucia Moniz, Thomas Sangster, Gregor Fisher, Chiwetel Ejiofor, Andrew Lincoln, Laura Linney, Rodrigo Santoro, Michael Fitzgerald, Kris Marshall, Abdul Salis, Heike Makatsch, Martin Freeman, Joanna Page, Olivia Olson, Billy Bob Thornton, Claudia Schiffer, Nina Sosanya, Ivana Milicevic, January Jones, Elisha Cuthbert, Shannon Elizabeth, Denise Richards, Lulu Popplewell, Marcus Brigstocke, Julia Davis, Ruby Turner, Adam Godley, Elisabeth Margoni, Meg Wynn Owen	
N O V E M B E R	14	The Big Empty	Artisan Entertainment / Aura Entertainment	Steve Anderson (director/screenplay); Jon Favreau, Joey Lauren Adams, Bud Cort, Jon Gries, Daryl Hannah, Adam Beach, Gary Farmer, Rachael Leigh Cook, Brent Briscoe, Melora Walters, Kelsey Grammer, Sean Bean, Patti Smith, Danny Trejo	
N O V E M B E R	14	Looney Tunes: Back in Action	Warner Bros. Pictures	Joe Dante (director); Larry Doyle (screenplay); Brendan Fraser, Jenna Elfman, Steve Martin, Timothy Dalton, Heather Locklear, Joan Cusack, Bill Goldberg, Matthew Lillard, Jeff Gordon, Kevin McCarthy, Michael Jordan, Roger Corman, Peter Graves, Marc Lawrence, Ron Perlman, Robert Picardo, Vernon Wells, Mary Woronov, Bill McKinney, George Murdock, Leo Rossi, Archie Hahn, Allan Graf, Martin Klebba, Joe Alaskey, Jeff Bennett, Bob Bergen, June Foray, Eric Goldberg, Bruce Lanoil, Billy West, Paul Julian, Will Ryan, Stan Freberg, Casey Kasem, Frank Welker, Mel Blanc, Don Stanton, Dan Stanton, Arturo Gil, Gabriel Pimental, Danny Mann, Danny Chambers	
N O V E M B E R	14	Master and Commander: The Far Side of the World	20th Century Fox / Miramax Films / Universal Pictures	Peter Weir (director/screenplay); John Collee (screenplay); Russell Crowe, Paul Bettany, Billy Boyd, James D'Arcy, Bryan Dick, Chris Larkin, Robert Pugh, Max Benitz, Max Pirkis, Lee Ingleby, Richard McCabe, Ian Mercer, Tony Dolan, David Threlfall, Joseph Morgan, George Innes, Patrick Gallagher, John DeSantis, Mark Lewis Jones, Edward Woodall, Jack Randall, Richard Pates, William Mannering, Alex Palmer, Thierry Segall, Ousmane Thiam	
N O V E M B E R	14	Tupac: Resurrection	Paramount Pictures	Lauren Lazin (director); Tupac Shakur	
N O V E M B E R	21	21 Grams	Focus Features	Alejandro González Iñárritu (director); Guillermo Arriaga (screenplay); Sean Penn, Naomi Watts, Benicio del Toro, Charlotte Gainsbourg, Danny Huston, John Rubinstein, Clea DuVall, Eddie Marsan, Melissa Leo, Marc Thomas Musso, Paul Calderón, Denis O'Hare, Kevin Chapman, Lew Temple, Carly Nahon	
N O V E M B E R	21	The Cat in the Hat	Universal Pictures / DreamWorks / Imagine Entertainment	Bo Welch (director/screenplay); Alec Berg, David Mandel (screenplay); Mike Myers, Alec Baldwin, Kelly Preston, Dakota Fanning, Spencer Breslin, Sean Hayes, Amy Hill, Danielle Chuchran, Taylor Rice, Dan Castellaneta, Steven Anthony Lawrence, Paris Hilton, Frank Welker, Candace Dean Brown, Victor Brandt, Daran Norris, Clint Howard, Paige Hurd	
N O V E M B E R	21	Gothika	Warner Bros. Pictures / Columbia Pictures	Mathieu Kassovitz (director); Sebastian Gutierrez (screenplay); Halle Berry, Robert Downey Jr., Penélope Cruz, Charles S. Dutton, John Carroll Lynch, Bernard Hill, Bronwen Mantel, Dorian Harewood, Matthew G. Taylor, Kathleen Mackey, Andrea Sheldon, Michel Perron, Anana Rydvald	
N O V E M B E R	26	Bad Santa	Dimension Films	Terry Zwigoff (director); Glenn Ficarra, John Requa (screenplay); Billy Bob Thornton, Bernie Mac, Lauren Graham, Tony Cox, Brett Kelly, John Ritter, Lauren Tom, Cloris Leachman, Octavia Spencer, Alex Borstein, Billy Gardell, Bryan Callen, Tom McGowan, Ajay Naidu, Ethan Phillips, Matt Walsh, Max Van Ville, Ryan Pinkston, Sheriff John Bunnell, Kerry Rossall	
N O V E M B E R	26	The Cooler	Lions Gate Films	Wayne Kramer (director/screenplay); Frank Hannah (screenplay); William H. Macy, Alec Baldwin, Maria Bello, Shawn Hatosy, Ron Livingston, Paul Sorvino, Estella Warren, Arthur J. Nascarella, Joey Fatone, Ellen Greene, M.C. Gainey, Tony Longo, Rachel Ako, Dee Bradley Baker, Portia Dawson, Don Scribner, Richard Israel, Gordon Michaels, Michelle Lopez, Timothy Landfield	
N O V E M B E R	26	The Haunted Mansion	Walt Disney Pictures	Rob Minkoff (director); David Berenbaum (screenplay); Eddie Murphy, Terence Stamp, Marsha Thomason, Jennifer Tilly, Nathaniel Parker, Wallace Shawn, Dina Spybey, Marc John Jefferies, Aree Davis, Jim Doughan, Rachael Harris, Steve Hytner, Heather Juergensen, Jeremy Howard, Deep Roy, The Dapper Dans, Martin Klebba, Derek Mears, Kelly Stables, Corey Burton	
N O V E M B E R	26	In America	Fox Searchlight Pictures	Jim Sheridan (director/screenplay); Naomi Sheridan, Kirsten Sheridan (screenplay); Samantha Morton, Paddy Considine, Sarah Bolger, Emma Bolger, Djimon Hounsou, Merrina Millsapp, Adrian Martinez	
N O V E M B E R	26	The Missing	Columbia Pictures / Revolution Studios / Imagine Entertainment	Ron Howard (director); Ken Kaufman (screenplay); Tommy Lee Jones, Cate Blanchett, Evan Rachel Wood, Jenna Boyd, Eric Schweig, Aaron Eckhart, Val Kilmer, Sergio Calderon, Elisabeth Moss, Steve Reevis, Jay Tavare, Simon Baker, Clint Howard, Ray McKinnon, Max Perlich, Deryle J. Lujan, David Midthunder	
N O V E M B E R	26	Timeline	Paramount Pictures / Mutual Film Company	Richard Donner (director); Jeff Maguire, George Nolfi (screenplay); Paul Walker, Frances O'Connor, Gerard Butler, Billy Connolly, David Thewlis, Anna Friel, Neal McDonough, Matt Craven, Ethan Embry, Michael Sheen, Lambert Wilson, Marton Csokas, Rossif Sutherland, Patrick Sabongui, Steve Kahan	
N O V E M B E R	28	Kim Possible: A Sitch in Time	Buena Vista Television	Steve Loter (director); Bill Motz, Bob Roth (screenplay); Christy Carlson Romano, Will Friedle, Nancy Cartwright, Tahj Mowry, John DiMaggio, Nicole Sullivan, Tom Kane, Brian George, Gary Cole, Jean Smart, Shaun Fleming, Raven-Symoné, Kirsten Storms, Dakota Fanning, Michael Dorn, Michael Clarke Duncan, Freddie Prinze Jr., Vivica A. Fox, Kelly Ripa, Elliott Gould, Andrea Martin, Richard Gilliland, Kath Soucie, Harrison Fahn	
D E C E M B E R	2	Beethoven's 5th	Universal Studios Home Video	Mark Griffiths (director); Cliff Ruby, Elana Lesser (screenplay); Dave Thomas, Faith Ford, Daveigh Chase, Tom Poston, Katherine Helmond, Sammy Kahn, Richard Riehle, Clint Howard, Kathy Griffin, John Larroquette, Rodman Flender, Lynne Marie Stewart, Mary Jo Catlett, Maria Ford, Tina Illman, Tom Musgrave, Joel Hurt Jones, Elizabeth Warner, Rick Dean, Michael Chieffo, Wayne Dalglish	
D E C E M B E R	5	Honey	Universal Pictures	Bille Woodruff (director); Alonzo Brown, Kim Watson (screenplay); Jessica Alba, Lil' Romeo, Mekhi Phifer, Joy Bryant, David Moscow, Lonette McKee, Zachary Williams, Laurie Ann Gibson, Missy Elliott, Jadakiss, Sheek Louch, Shawn Desman, Ginuwine, Rodney Jerkins, 3rd Storee, Tweet, Blaque	
D E C E M B E R	5	The Last Samurai	Warner Bros. Pictures	Edward Zwick (director/screenplay); John Logan, Marshall Herskovitz (screenplay); Tom Cruise, Timothy Spall, Billy Connolly, Tony Goldwyn, Ken Watanabe, Hiroyuki Sanada, Koyuki, Shin Koyamada, Masato Harada, Shichinosuke Nakamura, Seizo Fukumoto, Shun Sugata, Scott Wilson	
D E C E M B E R	5	The Station Agent	Miramax Films	Tom McCarthy (director/screenplay); Peter Dinklage, Patricia Clarkson, Bobby Cannavale, Michelle Williams, Raven Goodwin, Paul Benjamin, Jayce Bartok, Joe Lo Truglio, John Slattery, Lynn Cohen, Richard Kind, Josh Pais	
D E C E M B E R	12	Georges Bataille's Story of the Eye	ARM/Cinema 25	Andrew Repasky McElhinney (director/co-screenplay); Melissa Elizabeth Forgione, Querelle Haynes, Sean Timothy Sexton, Courtney Shea, Claude Barrington While	
D E C E M B E R	12	Girl with a Pearl Earring	Lions Gate Films	Peter Webber (director); Olivia Hetreed (screenplay); Colin Firth, Scarlett Johansson, Tom Wilkinson, Judy Parfitt, Cillian Murphy, Essie Davis, Joanna Scanlan, Alakina Mann, Chris McHallem, Gabrielle Reidy, Rollo Weeks, Anna Popplewell, Geoff Bell, John McEnery	
D E C E M B E R	12	Love Don't Cost a Thing	Warner Bros. Pictures / Alcon Entertainment	Troy Beyer (director); Michael Swerdlick (screenplay); Nick Cannon, Christina Milian, Kenan Thompson, Kal Penn, Vanessa Bell Calloway, Steve Harvey, Ashley Monique Clark, Elimu Nelson, Melissa Schuman, Reagan Gomez-Preston, Sam Sarpong, Nicole Scherzinger, Stuart Scott, Dante Basco, Al Thompson, Russell W. Howard, Nichole Galicia, Kevin Christy, Peter Siragusa, Imani Parks, Shani Pride, Gay Thomas Wilson, J.B. Guhman Jr., Ian Chidlaw	
D E C E M B E R	12	Something's Gotta Give	Columbia Pictures / Warner Bros. Pictures	Nancy Meyers (director/screenplay); Jack Nicholson, Diane Keaton, Keanu Reeves, Amanda Peet, Frances McDormand, Jon Favreau, Paul Michael Glaser, Rachel Ticotin, KaDee Strickland, Peter Spears	
D E C E M B E R	12	Stuck on You	20th Century Fox	Peter Farrelly, Robert Farrelly (director/screenplay); Matt Damon, Greg Kinnear, Eva Mendes, Seymour Cassel, Cher, Dane Cook, Lin Shaye, Bella Thorne, Jessica Cauffiel, Pat Crawford Brown, Stephen Saux, Tracy Ashton, Griffin Dunne, Jay Leno, Ricky Williams, Ben Carson, Cameron Diaz, Mary Hart, Fernanda Lima, Frankie Muniz, Meryl Streep, Luke Wilson, Jesse Ventura, Tom Brady, Lawyer Milloy, Wen Yann Shih, Ray Valliere, Tommy Songin, Terence Bernie Hines, Jackie Flynn, Danny Murphy, Steve Tyler	
D E C E M B E R	17	The Lord of the Rings: The Return of the King	New Line Cinema	Peter Jackson (director); Fran Walsh, Philippa Boyens (screenplay); Elijah Wood, Ian McKellen, Viggo Mortensen, Sean Astin, Cate Blanchett, John Rhys-Davies, Bernard Hill, Billy Boyd, Dominic Monaghan, Orlando Bloom, Hugo Weaving, Liv Tyler, Miranda Otto, David Wenham, Karl Urban, John Noble, Andy Serkis, Ian Holm, Sean Bean, Marton Csokas, Lawrence Makoare, Thomas Robins, Peter Jackson, Christian Rivers, Royd Tolkien	
D E C E M B E R	19	Calendar Girls	Touchstone Pictures	Nigel Cole (director); Tim Firth, Juliette Towhidi (screenplay); Helen Mirren, Julie Walters, Linda Bassett, Annette Crosbie, Celia Imrie, Penelope Wilton, Geraldine James, Philip Glenister, Ciaran Hinds, John Alderton, George Costigan, John-Paul Macleod, Georgie Glen, Angela Curran, Rosalind March, Lesley Staples, Janet Howd, Graham Crowden, Belinda Everett, Marc Pickering, Harriet Thorpe, Gillian Wright, John Sharian, Richard Braine, Ted Robbins, Alison Pargeter, Angus Barnett, John Sparkes, Elizabeth Bennett, Christa Ackroyd, Matt Malloy, Patton Oswalt, John Fortune, Jay Leno, Anthrax	
D E C E M B E R	19	House of Sand and Fog	DreamWorks	Vadim Perelman (director/screenplay); Shawn Lawrence Otto (screenplay); Jennifer Connelly, Ben Kingsley, Ron Eldard, Frances Fisher, Kim Dickens, Shohreh Aghdashloo, Jonathan Ahdout, Carlos Gomez, Navi Rawat	
D E C E M B E R	19	Mona Lisa Smile	Columbia Pictures / Revolution Studios / Red OM Films	Mike Newell (director); Lawrence Konner, Mark Rosenthal (screenplay); Julia Roberts, Kirsten Dunst, Julia Stiles, Maggie Gyllenhaal, Ginnifer Goodwin, Dominic West, Juliet Stevenson, Marcia Gay Harden, John Slattery, Marian Seldes, Laura Allen, Tori Amos, Emily Bauer, Jordan Bridges, Lisa Roberts Gillan, Topher Grace, Annika Marks, Ebon Moss-Bachrach, Lily Rabe, Terence Rigby, Krysten Ritter	
D E C E M B E R	24	Monster	Newmarket Films / Denver & Delilah Films / K/W Productions	Patty Jenkins (director/screenplay); Charlize Theron, Christina Ricci, Bruce Dern, Lee Tergesen, Annie Corley, Pruitt Taylor Vince, Marco St. John, Marc Macaulay, Scott Wilson, Kane Hodder, Brett Rice	
D E C E M B E R	25	Big Fish	Columbia Pictures	Tim Burton (director); John August (screenplay); Ewan McGregor, Albert Finney, Billy Crudup, Jessica Lange, Helena Bonham Carter, Alison Lohman, Robert Guillaume, Marion Cotillard, Steve Buscemi, Danny DeVito, Missi Pyle, Matthew McGrory, David Denman, Loudon Wainwright III, Deep Roy, Miley Cyrus, Billy Redden, Russell Hodgkinson, Daniel Wallace, Ada Tai, Arlene Tai, Perry Walston, Hailey Anne Nelson, Grayson Stone, R. Keith Harris, Karla Droege, Zachary Gardner, John Lowell, Darrell Vanterpool, Joseph Humphrey, George McArthur, Bevin Kaye	
D E C E M B E R	25	Cheaper by the Dozen	20th Century Fox	Shawn Levy (director); Sam Harper, Joel Cohen, Alec Sokolow (screenplay); Steve Martin, Bonnie Hunt, Hilary Duff, Piper Perabo, Tom Welling, Alyson Stoner, Kevin G. Schmidt, Jacob Smith, Forrest Landis, Liliana Mumy, Morgan York, Blake Woodruff, Brent Kinsman, Shane Kinsman, Paula Marshall, Alan Ruck, Steven Anthony Lawrence, Richard Jenkins, Ashton Kutcher, Tiffany Dupont, Cody Linley, Jared Padalecki, Joel McCrary, Dax Shepard, Regis Philbin, Kelly Ripa, Frank Welker, Wayne Knight, Amy Hill, Shawn Levy	
D E C E M B E R	25	Cold Mountain	Miramax Films / Mirage Enterprises	Anthony Minghella (director/screenplay); Jude Law, Nicole Kidman, Renée Zellweger, Eileen Atkins, Kathy Baker, James Gammon, Brendan Gleeson, Philip Seymour Hoffman, Natalie Portman, Giovanni Ribisi, Lucas Black, Donald Sutherland, Cillian Murphy, Ethan Suplee, Jay Tavare, Jack White, Ray Winstone, Melora Walters, Taryn Manning, Emily Deschanel, Charlie Hunnam, Tom Aldredge, James Rebhorn, Jena Malone, Richard Brake	
D E C E M B E R	25	The Company	Sony Pictures Classics	Robert Altman (director); Barbara Turner (screenplay); Neve Campbell, Malcolm McDowell, James Franco	
D E C E M B E R	25	Paycheck	Paramount Pictures / DreamWorks	John Woo (director); Dean Georgaris (screenplay); Ben Affleck, Uma Thurman, Aaron Eckhart, Paul Giamatti, Colm Feore, Joe Morton, Michael C. Hall, Peter Friedman, Ivana Milicevic, Kathryn Morris, Krista Allen	
D E C E M B E R	25	Peter Pan	Universal Pictures / Columbia Pictures / Revolution Studios	P. J. Hogan (director/screenplay); Michael Goldenberg (screenplay); Jeremy Sumpter, Ludivine Sagnier, Rachel Hurd-Wood, Jason Isaacs, Olivia Williams, Saffron Burrows, Lynn Redgrave, Richard Briers, Geoffrey Palmer, Harry Newell, Rupert Simonian, George MacKay, Harry Eden, Freddie Popplewell, Theodore Chester, Patrick Gooch, Lachlan Gooch	
D E C E M B E R	30	Leprechaun: Back 2 tha Hood	Lions Gate Home Entertainment	Steven Ayromlooi (director/screenplay); Warwick Davis, Tangi Miller, Laz Alonso, Page Kennedy, Sherrie Jackson, Donzaleigh Abernathy, Shiek Mahmud-Bey, Sticky Fingaz, Keesha Sharp, Sonya Eddy, Beau Billingslea, Chris Murray, Vickilyn Reynolds, Willie C. Carpenter	

== See also ==
- List of 2003 box office number-one films in the United States
- 2003 in the United States
