= David Dorfman (disambiguation) =

David Dorfman (born 1993) is an American attorney and retired actor.

David Dorfman may also refer to:

- David Dorfman (choreographer) (born 1955), American dancer, choreographer, musician, activist and teacher
- David S. Dorfman, American screenwriter

== See also ==
- Dave Dorman (born 1958), American illustrator
- David Dorman (born 1954), American telecommunications chief executive
