= David Dorfman (choreographer) =

- Born: November 7, 1955
- Known for: Dance and choreography
- Movement: Modern dance
- Awards: Martha Hill Fund for Dance's Mid-Career Award (2007); Guggenheim Foundation fellowship (2005)

For the actor, see David Dorfman, and for the screenwriter, see David S. Dorfman

David Dorfman (born 1955) is a dancer, choreographer, musician, activist and teacher. A native of Chicago, he received his bachelor of science in business administration degree in 1977 from Olin Business School at Washington University in St. Louis. In 1981, he received his MFA in dance from Connecticut College in New London, Connecticut, where he is regularly the chairperson of the department of dance, having joined the faculty in 2004. In 1985 he founded his company David Dorfman Dance, one of the nation's leading modern dance companies. He received a Guggenheim Fellowship in 2005 to continue his research and choreography in the topics of power and powerlessness, including activism, dissidence and underground movements. He has also been awarded four fellowships from the National Endowment for the Arts, three New York Foundation for the Arts fellowships, an American Choreographer's Award, the first Paul Taylor Fellowship from The Yard, and a 1996 New York Dance & Performance Award ("Bessie").

His choreography has been produced in New York City at venues ranging from Lincoln Center Out of Doors and the BAM Next Wave Festival to The Kitchen, the Joyce Theater, Dance Theater Workshop, Danspace Project/St. Mark's Church, P.S. 122 and Dancing in the Streets. His work has been commissioned widely in the U.S. and in Europe, most recently by Bedlam Dance Company (London), d9 Dance Collective (Seattle), and the Prince Music Theater in Philadelphia for the musical Green Violin, for which he won a 2003 Barrymore Award for best choreography.

Dorfman was the recipient of a 2010 Whalie Award (southeastern Connecticut music awards) for the best hip hop/rap group for his work with the band, as well as a 2011 Whalie for Album of the Year for the release Two Sides.

In 2017, Dorfman made his Broadway debut as choreographer of Paula Vogel's play Indecent, which was nominated for three Tony Awards, including the Tony Award for Best Play.

In addition to his work in dance, Dorfman also performs with the New London-based hip hop band Above/Below, playing baritone saxophone.

== Works ==
- Prophets of Funk - Dance to the Music, using the music of Sly and the Family Stone
- Disavowal, which examines the life and legacy of abolitionist and (in)famous "race traitor" John Brown
- underground, inspired by a documentary on the Weathermen
- Older Testaments, to music by composer/trumpeter Frank London of The Klezmatics
- Lightbulb Theory and Impending Joy
- See Level, the company's first evening-length work
- To Lie Tenderly and Subverse
- A Cure for Gravity, set to music by popular composer and recording artist Joe Jackson
- (A)Way Out of My Body
- truce songs, an evening-length piece made in collaboration with the dancers and musicians/composers Lizzy de Lise and Sam Crawford
