= The Son Also Rises (Battlestar Galactica) =

- Battlestar Galactica episode
- Episode no.: Season 3 Episode 18
- Directed by: Robert Young
- Written by: Michael Angeli
- Original air date: March 11, 2007

Guest appearance
- Mark Sheppard as Romo Lampkin

Episode chronology
| ← Previous "Maelstrom" | Next → "Crossroads" |
- Battlestar Galactica season 3

"The Son Also Rises" is the eighteenth episode of the third season from the science fiction television series, Battlestar Galactica. Its title is a play on the title of the famous Ernest Hemingway novel, The Sun Also Rises.

== Plot ==
The episode begins aboard Colonial One with President Roslin randomly drawing the names of five ship captains to appoint as judges for Gaius Baltar's tribunal. Admiral Adama happens to be the fifth name she draws, to her surprise. Aboard Galactica, Admiral Adama looks over Starbuck's personnel file and reminisces about the late pilot. On the hangar deck, an inebriated Samuel Anders stands atop a Viper, grieving over Starbuck and causing a scene. Apollo climbs up to offer Anders solace, but Anders says he has to leave. In his uncoordinated state, Anders falls from the viper and injures his leg.

Meanwhile, Racetrack prepares her Raptor to shuttle Baltar's attorney, Alan Hughes, to the Zephyr. As Hughes boards the Raptor, Racetrack comments negatively about the arrogant lawyer and the fact that she's been assigned as his personal chauffeur. Suddenly, a bomb hidden inside the Raptor explodes, killing Hughes. On Colonial One, Roslin meets with the press, who are concerned about the possibility of more terrorist attacks. Roslin maintains that she will not let the attack deter the court from giving Baltar a fair trial. Back aboard Galactica, Apollo conducts a briefing with his pilots, but he is distracted by thoughts of Starbuck. In an embarrassing moment, he comments on a joke told by Racetrack, accidentally calling her Starbuck.

Meanwhile, Roslin and the tribunal judges interview Romo Lampkin, Baltar's replacement counsel, who is shown to be a very eccentric individual who constantly wears a blue overcoat and sunglasses. When Roslin asks why he volunteered to be Baltar's legal counsel, possibly risking his life because of it, he claims he's doing it for the "fame." Everyone is then startled by Lampkin's cat, which jumps on Roslin's desk. Lampkin claims the cat belonged to his late wife, and that he brought the animal along in a tote bag.

On Galactica, Admiral Adama questions Apollo's fitness for duty and grounds him from flying until he can get his head straight. In the meantime, he assigns Helo as CAG and puts Apollo in charge of security for Lampkin, much to his son's objection. Apollo meets Lampkin and learns that he studied under Apollo’s grandfather, Joseph Adama, a man he says he hated. Lampkin requests to see his client Baltar, but chooses Apollo's quarters for the meeting, saying Baltar's cell and Lampkin's assigned quarters may be booby trapped or bugged. The meeting is arranged, and as Apollo watches, Baltar and Lampkin discuss the trial. Baltar scribbles notes for his manifesto, saying the tribunal will use Caprica Six's statements against him.

Lampkin later requests to go to Colonial One, but since Apollo is grounded from flight, he asks Athena to shuttle Lampkin and himself over. As Lampkin boards the Raptor, his cat escapes and crawls under the craft. Frustrated, Chief Tyrol stoops down to coax the animal out, but in doing so he finds another bomb attached to the landing gear. Everyone scrambles for safety, but the bomb doesn't go off. Later, Admiral Adama admonishes his son for disobeying orders and tells him to remain focused on his duty, regardless of grief for Starbuck. Tyrol conducts an investigation of the latest bomb and reveals that someone on the flight deck crew is the assassin. Cally Tyrol is convinced that it's a Cylon plot and indirectly points the blame at Athena. Her accusation is disregarded, but Athena is outraged, asking Cally why she would bomb her own Raptor.

Meanwhile, Lampkin gets approval from Roslin to interview Caprica Six in an interrogation room. Roslin, Tory Foster and Admiral Adama eavesdrops on the conversation from the observation room. During the interview, Six says she will cooperate in prosecuting Baltar, but Lampkin says that Baltar still loves her deeply. He tells her that unlike Baltar, she will not be given a trial. He removes his sunglasses and gives her Baltar's pen, saying it was limited freedom that Baltar gave up for her. Six is moved, but returns the pen, saying the guards won't let her have it. In the meantime, Baltar panics in his cell at the mysterious "loss" of his pen.

As Lampkin retires for the evening, Deckhand Figurski gives him a box of paperwork from Colonial One. The marines check the box for sabotage, but then one notices a screw on the deck. As Lampkin enters the code to open his door, the guard shoves him to the ground just as a bomb hidden in the keypad detonates. Lampkin survives the explosion, but is taken to sickbay. Apollo visits him and brings Lampkin's tote bag, sans the cat, but filled with a curious array of items. When Apollo inquires why he has Roslin's reading glasses, Lampkin says "I borrow things." He admits to having kleptomania and is compelled to steal "something" from everyone he meets. Lee, however, is exempt; though he debated stealing Starbuck's photo, Lee "has had enough stolen from him already." Apollo also finds one of the prosecuting lawyers' sandals and a tarnished button from Admiral Adama's uniform. When he comes across a magnet from the previous explosive devices, Apollo becomes alarmed. Lampkin says he lifted it off Captain Kelly. Apollo then confronts Kelly who admits he's the bomber. He tells Apollo the only option is to have him locked up, for he will continue his attacks as long as Baltar is alive.

In a meeting with Admiral Adama, Apollo is reinstated as CAG and pulled off from the legal counsel for Baltar's trial. Apollo, however, now wishes to help Lampkin; Adama doesn't allow it, saying the job is too risky, and tells Apollo to return to duty. A heated discussion ensues, with Apollo asking Adama if it is an order to return to duty. Adama responds by saying he is through giving Apollo orders. Apollo goes to Memorial Highway and puts Starbuck's photo next to Kat. Anders wanders up on crutches, and the two finally come to terms with the loss of Starbuck. Adama returns to the command center, telling the XO to remove Apollo from CAG status, as he has other things to attend to. Meanwhile, Baltar receives an envelope from Lampkin via Apollo which contains his pen and a poetic note stating, "There's no greater ally, no force more powerful, no enemy more resolved than a son who chooses to step from his father's shadow."

Deleted scene

Athena confronts Cally about her accusations of planting the bomb, which gets physical. Athena hands Cally her sidearm and Cally points it at Athena's chest. Athena taunts her to pull the trigger, but Cally hesitates. Cally tells Athena that she can't bring herself to shoot because she knows Athena loves her daughter, and her husband Helo, and that she would never do anything to jeopardize them (like planting a bomb). Cally lowers the gun and Athena grabs it and quickly points the weapon next to Cally's head. Athena warns that if Cally is the one discovered to have planted the bomb, Athena will kill her herself.

== Emmy Award consideration ==
Tricia Helfer submitted this episode for consideration in the category of "Outstanding Supporting Actress in a Drama Series" on her behalf for the 2007 Emmy Awards.
