= Brad Marshall =

American actor (born 1967)

- Born: Bradley Hamil Marshall; April 11, 1967 (age 59); Nairobi, Kenya
- Years active: 1993–present
- Website: www.bradmarshall.org

Brad Marshall (born April 11, 1967) is an American actor.

Marshall was born in Nairobi, Kenya to Brad Marshall and Sandy Marshall. He has three brothers: Ryan, Neil, and Eric. He lives in Knoxville, Tennessee.

== Filmography ==
- 1993 Civil War Journal as Col. Strong Vincent
- 1996 The New Detectives: Case Studies in Forensic Science as Stephen Vance Taylor
- 1998 The FBI Files as Detective van Claussen
- 2002 One Last Cigarette as Vlad
- 2002 American's Most Wanted as James Detmer
- 2002 Eating and Weeping as President
- 2002 North of Dupont as Congressman Sonny Fenwick
- 2002 Dr. Jekyll and Mr. Hyde as Dr. Humbolt
- 2003 Head of State as Demolition man
- 2003 Smithee's Lecture as Professor Englot
- 2003 Operation Neighborhood Freedom as Dave Simpson
- 2006 Teen Wolff 3: The Return of the Wolf as Bear #3
- 2006 Cops as Malloy
