= My Boss's Daughter =

2003 film by David Zucker

My Boss' Daughter
- Promotional film poster
- Directed by: David Zucker
- Written by: David Dorfman
- Produced by: Gil Netter; John Jacobs
- Starring: Ashton Kutcher; Tara Reid; Jeffrey Tambor; Andy Richter; Terence Stamp; Molly Shannon
- Cinematography: Martin McGrath
- Edited by: Patrick Lussier; Sam Craven
- Music by: Teddy Castellucci
- Production companies: Gil Netter Productions; John Jacobs Productions
- Distributed by: Dimension Films; Miramax Films
- Release date: August 22, 2003
- Running time: 86 minutes 90 minutes (R-rated version)
- Country: United States
- Language: English
- Budget: $14 million
- Box office: $18.2 million

My Boss's Daughter is a 2003 American comedy film directed by David Zucker. It stars Ashton Kutcher, Tara Reid, Jeffrey Tambor, Andy Richter, Terence Stamp, and Molly Shannon. The film revolves around a man housesitting for his boss and getting into various hijinks with the people who come over to his place. My Boss's Daughter was released by Dimension Films and Miramax Films on August 22, 2003. The film received negative reviews from critics and grossed $18.2 million worldwide against a $14 million budget.

It was Zucker's mother Charlotte Zucker's final film role before her death on September 5, 2007.

== Plot ==
Tom Stansfield is a researcher at a publishing company in Chicago who works under the tyrannical Jack Taylor. Tom has a crush on his boss' daughter, Lisa, who is completely controlled by her overprotective father.

Lisa reveals to Tom that her father is making her house-sit the same night as a party she wants to attend, so he convinces her to stand up to her father and attend the party anyway. Lisa asks him to come to their house that night, leading Tom to think that she has invited him to the party; in reality, she just wants him to fill in for her - he reluctantly agrees.

A comedy of errors ensues, including the return of Lisa's older brother Red, on the run from drug dealers. He dumps drugs into the toilet, and instead returns a bag of flour to the drug dealer.

One of Tom's tasks is to guard their owl, O-J, which lives in an open cage (it has not been able to fly due to a deep depression, from the loss of a prior mate). When the bird drinks from the toilet polluted with drugs, it flies away. Jack's ex-secretary Audrey goes to the house to try to earn her job back. After fighting with her boyfriend, she stays over at the house.

Lisa returns home after finding out that her boyfriend Hans is cheating on her. Tom hides everything that happened and she spends some time with him thinking he is gay. He clarifies to her that he's actually straight and she starts to like him. Audrey's friend thinks she has breast cancer and asks Tom to feel her breasts. Lisa walks in on them and is disgusted.

T.J., the drug dealer, discovers the 'drugs' he collected earlier was actually flour, so he threatens to kill Tom if he doesn't return his money. T.J. tries to open a safe and steal the money. However, Tom gives him sleeping pills mixed with alcohol which sends him into a coma.

As they think T.J. is dead, Audrey and her friends bury him. Later, T.J. escapes from the grave and threatens to kill Lisa. With Red's help, Tom rescues Lisa and she falls in love with him. He then goes to get her father, but on the way back the owl gets into the car making Tom lose control of the car and crash into the house. They find police officers in the house looking for T.J., who ends up getting arrested.

Jack is enraged by the damages done to the house and throws Tom out. He plans to take him and Lisa to Thailand. The next day, while looking for the owl on a tree branch, he overhears his son explaining to Lisa how she should stand up to their father and go back to Tom along with how he has treated them. Red bails Jack out of jail to help him get to the airport in time. Jack realizes his mistakes and gives Tom a promotion while Hans instead goes to Thailand.

== Cast ==
- Ashton Kutcher as Tom Stansfield
- Tara Reid as Lisa Taylor
- Terence Stamp as Jack Taylor Sr.
- Molly Shannon as Audrey Bennett
- Andy Richter as Jack "Red" Taylor Jr.
- Michael Madsen as T.J.
- Tyler Labine as "Spike"
- Jon Abrahams as Paul
- Patrick Crenshaw as Old Man Neighbor
- Angela Little as Sheryl
- David Koechner as Speed
- Carmen Electra as Tina
- Kenan Thompson as Hans
- Jeffrey Tambor as Ken
- Dave Foley as Henderson
- Charlotte Zucker as Gertrude

== Production ==
In December 2000, it was announced Dimension Films had acquired David S. Dorfman's spec script The Guest two years after it was originally acquired by New Line Cinema.

== Release ==
The movie was released by Dimension Films on August 22, 2003, opening at #10 at the U.S. box office and grossed $4,855,798 on its opening weekend. It was released domestically in 2,206 theaters grossing $15,550,605 in the United States. The film was also released in foreign theaters, grossing a further $2,640,400 with its highest sales of $691,999 in Russia and its lowest sales in the Czech Republic, for a total of $18,191,005 worldwide.

=== Home media ===
The film was released on DVD on February 3, 2004. Dimension Films was sold by The Walt Disney Company in 2005, with its parent label Miramax then being sold by Disney in 2010. That same year, private equity firm Filmyard Holdings took control of Miramax and the pre-October 2005 library of Dimension. Filmyard sublicensed the film's home media rights to Echo Bridge Entertainment, who reissued it on DVD on April 12, 2011. In 2011, Echo Bridge also bundled it together on a DVD set with three other Miramax romantic comedies (1997's Wishful Thinking and 2000's Down to You and About Adam). Additionally, Echo Bridge issued it on a double feature Blu-ray, which also included the 2003 Miramax film Duplex.

In 2016, Qatari company beIN Media Group purchased Miramax, and then during April 2020, ViacomCBS (now known as Paramount Skydance) bought a 49% stake in Miramax, which gave them the rights to the Miramax library and the pre-October 2005 Dimension library. Paramount Home Entertainment re-released the film on DVD on February 23, 2021, also re-releasing many other Dimension/Miramax titles around this time. On November 29, 2022, Paramount Home Entertainment reissued the 2011 release that bundled the film together with Duplex. However, this was a DVD release rather than a Blu-ray release like the original. The film was later made available on Paramount's streaming service Paramount+.

== Reception ==
My Boss's Daughter garnered overwhelmingly negative reviews from critics. On the review aggregator website Rotten Tomatoes, 7% of 73 critics' reviews are positive, with an average rating of 2.7/10. The website's consensus reads: "Offensive, incoherent, and ineptly acted and directed." Metacritic, which uses a weighted average, assigned the film a score of 15 out of 100, based on 19 critics, indicating "overwhelming dislike".

Scott Tobias of The A.V. Club criticized Zucker's comedic timing of his stock-in-trade non-sequiturs and Kutcher's "sleepwalking" performance for failing to keep the rest of the cast grounded, calling it "an abysmal screwball comedy that relies heavily on idiocy from both sides of the screen." Elvis Mitchell of The New York Times called it a "muddled comedy of confusion" that delivers tasteless and outdated Farrelly brothers-style humor. Entertainment Weekly's Lisa Schwarzbaum gave the film an overall F grade. She criticized the "manic sloppiness" of the jokes from the supporting ensemble and Zucker's direction for feeling like "a substitute teacher soldiering through a day's work for a day's pay at a decertified school." Robert Koehler of Variety felt that Zucker broke a cardinal rule of making comedy look like a lot of work by misusing the comedic talents of his cast but concluded that: "Nonetheless, the movie looks and sounds reasonably good, particularly with Andrew Laws' crucial and shiny production design."

The film received three nominations at the 24th Golden Raspberry Awards including Worst Actor for Ashton Kutcher (also for Cheaper by the Dozen and Just Married), Worst Supporting Actress for Tara Reid and Worst Screen Couple for both Kutcher and Reid (also for Just Married with Brittany Murphy), but lost to Ben Affleck (Daredevil, Gigli and Paycheck), Demi Moore (Charlie's Angels: Full Throttle) and both Affleck and Jennifer Lopez (Gigli) respectively.
