= Georgia Craig =

Canadian actress

- Born: March 20, 1979 (age 47); Vancouver, British Columbia, Canada
- Occupation: Actress
- Years active: 2003–present

Georgia Craig (born March 20, 1979, in Vancouver, British Columbia) is a Canadian actress. She pursued classical studies at Montreal's National Theatre School of Canada, graduating in 2001. She worked as a pollster and bartender before her first movie appearance in How to Lose a Guy in 10 Days in 2003.

Craig is known to science fiction fans from her roles as Sabrina Gosling in the Stargate SG-1 episode "Moebius" and as Oracle Yolanda Brenn in the reimagined Battlestar Galactica.

Craig was a casting associate working on the CBC Television drama Arctic Air. Georgia Craig was passionate about acting from a young age. Then She pursued classical studies at Montreal’s National Theatre School of Canada, graduating in 2001.

== Filmography ==
=== Film ===
Year	Film	Role
2003	How to Lose a Guy in 10 Days	Receptionist Candi
2004	Dawn of the Dead	Anchorwoman
2005	Sisterhood of the Traveling Pants	Saleslady
2006	Catch and Release	Persephone
2007	Good Luck Chuck	Howard's wife
2009	Case 39	Denise (uncredited)

=== Television ===
Year	Series	Role	Notes
2004	The 4400	Mary Deneville	Episodes: "Becoming"; "Trial by Fire"
2005	Stargate SG-1	Sabrina Gosling	Episode: "Moebius, Part 1"
2005	Tru Calling	Vivian	Episode: "In the Dark"
2005	Killer Instinct	Janet Hansen	Episode: "Pilot"
2005-2006	The L Word	Becky Haspel / Resident Nurse	Episodes: "Losing the Light"; "Lacuna"
2006	A Job to Kill For	Stacy Sherman	Television movie
2006	The Dead Zone	Nikki Griffith	Episode: "Independence Day"
2006	Masters of Horror	Jodi Reddle	Episode: "The Damned Thing"
2007	Supernatural	Sherri	Episode: "Nightshifter"
2007	Battlestar Galactica	Oracle Yolanda Brenn	Episode: "Maelstrom"
