= Bibi Nshimba =

Congolese-American actress, film producer, writer

- Born: August 18, 1976 (age 49)
- Occupations: Actress, Producer, Writer
- Known for: NCIS: Los Angeles (2014); Ben and Becca (2012); Oluwa (2010)

Bibi Nshimba also Bibi Amos (born August 18, 1976) is a Congolese-American actress, producer and writer.

== Career ==
In the TV Series created by Shane Brennan, NCIS: Los Angeles, first released in 2009 and featured on CBS, she was featured as Receptionist in 1 Episode, 2014.

In 2012, she wrote, produced and starred in the short drama film, Ben and Becca, as "Rebecca", a medical student from Africa. The film also featured Brian Krause as "Ben" and was directed by Victor Alferi.

She featured in the 2016 TV series directed by Neil Druckmann and Bruce Straley titled, Uncharted 4: A Thief's End, as one of the "Additional Voices".

In 2018, she co-directed a short drama film title, True Faith, alongside Prince Steven Obeni Bottan in which she acted the role of "Angelica". Other cast include Vanessa Bisono, Andrey Bereza and Tito Londole.

== Filmatography ==
=== Films ===
Year	Film	Role	Notes	Ref.
2019	The American Family The Play	Actress (Barbara Strong)	Comedy	
2019	Alone	Actress (Anna's Friend)	Short film, Drama, Thriller	
2019	Asylum	Actress (Bomenga); Producer	Short film, Drama	
2019	$Dollar$	Actress (Yvonne (Adult))	Short film, Drama	
2018	True Faith	Actress (Angelica); Director	Short film, Drama	
2018	Undrafted	Actress (Michelle Lundsted); Producer	Drama	
2017	Untrafficked	Actress (Kenaya); Writer	Short film, Action, Drama	
2017	Rift (VII)	Actress (Nurse)	Short film, Drama	
2016	Uncharted 4: A Thief's End	Additional Voices	Thriller, Drama	
2016	Victims of Silence	Actress (Mapendo); Writer	Short film, Drama	
2016	Gubagude Ko	Actress (Malika (uncredited))	Short film, Drama	
2016	Redemption Process	Actress (Receptionist); Producer	Drama	
2015	Checkmate	Actress (Rachel (as Bibi Amos))	Action, Crime, Thriller	
2014	Only Light	Actress (Laeticia's Mom (as Bibi Amos)	Short film, Action, Drama	
2012	Ben and Becca	Actress (Rebecca (as Bibi Amos)); Writer; Producer	Short film, Drama, Romance	
2012	Tragedy of a Mother and Son	Actress (Hostess (as Bibi Amos))	Action, Drama, Family	
2012	A Matter of Choice	Costume (Wardrobe (as Bibi Amos))	Short film, Drama, Family	
2011	Machine Gun Preacher	Additional voices (uncredited)	Action, Biography, Crime	
2010	Oluwa	Actress (Oluwa (as Bibi Amos))	Short film, Drama, Horror	
2009	Illegal Immigrant	Actress (Mercy (voice) (as Bibi Amos))	Short film, Drama	
2006	Splinter Cell: Double Agent	Actress (Voice (as Bibi Amos))	Action, Adventure, Crime	
2004	El padrino	Actress (Prison Visitor (uncredited))	Action, Crime, Drama	
2003	Bringing Down the House	Actress (Club Goer (uncredited))	Comedy	

=== Television series ===
Year	TV series	Role	Notes	Ref.
2007 -	Mlx	Actress (Armina (Unknown episodes))	TV series, Horror	
2017	RomCon	Actress (Fangirl Rachel)	TV series, Comedy	
2016 -	Bull	Actress (Captain Sharice Wellstone)	TV series	
2016	Party Betchez	Actress (Party Goer, 1 Episode, 2016)	TV series (2014-), Comedy	
2009 -	NCIS: Los Angeles	Actress (Receptionist)	TV series, Action, Crime, Drama	
2003	The Practice	Actress (Refuter #4)	TV series (1997-2004), Crime, Drama, Mystery	
