= David S. Dorfman =

American screenwriter

- Born: Riverdale, New York, United States
- Occupation: Screenwriter

David Dorfman is an American screenwriter. He attended New York University and moved to Los Angeles to pursue a career in screenwriting. After years of working as a script reader at William Morris, Dorfman finally broke through and sold his first major script to New Line Cinema, originally entitled The Guest, in 1998.

The film's release was delayed and Dorfman's second major script, Anger Management, was actually released first. Anger Management spent two weeks at the top spot at the box office during April 2003 and grossed more than $135 million. The Guest, eventually released during the summer of 2003 under the name My Boss's Daughter, could not match the major success of Anger Management, grossing almost $16 million. Dorfman was rewarded for his work by being named to the list of "Ten Hottest Voices in Comedy" by Variety.
