= Kenneth Lay =

Founder of Enron Corporation (1942–2006)

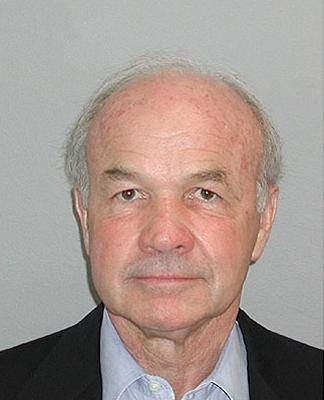
- Mugshot of Lay upon his arrest in 2004
- Born: Kenneth Lee Lay; April 15, 1942; Tyrone, Missouri, U.S.
- Died: July 5, 2006 (aged 64); Snowmass, Colorado, U.S.
- Education: University of Missouri (BA, MA); University of Houston (PhD)
- Occupation: Businessman
- Spouses: Linda Lay; Judith Ayers
- Children: 5

Signature
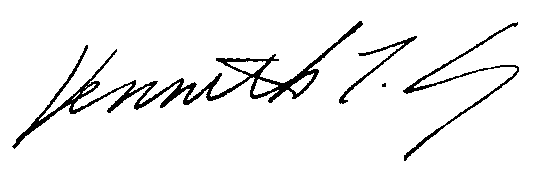

Kenneth Lee Lay (April 15, 1942 – July 5, 2006) was an American businessman and political donor who was the founder, chief executive officer and chairman of Enron. He was heavily involved in Enron's accounting scandal that unraveled in 2001 into the largest bankruptcy ever to that date. Lay was indicted by a grand jury and was found guilty of 10 counts of securities fraud at trial. Lay died in July 2006 while vacationing in his house near Aspen, Colorado, three months before his scheduled sentencing. A preliminary autopsy reported Lay died of a heart attack caused by coronary artery disease. His death resulted in a vacated judgment.

Lay left behind "a legacy of shame" characterized by "mismanagement and dishonesty". In 2009 a list posted on Portfolio.com ranked Lay as the third-worst American CEO of all time. (Note: Lay was ranked third-worst behind Angelo Mozilo at second-worst and Dick Fuld at worst overall.) His actions were the catalyst for subsequent and fundamental corporate reform in regard to "standards of leadership, governance, and accountability".

Lay was one of America's highest-paid CEOs; between 1998 and 2001, he collected more than $220 million in cash and stock in Enron, selling 1.7 million of those shares. However, during his trial in 2006, Lay claimed that Enron stock made up about 90% of his wealth, and that his net worth at that time was negative $250,000.

== Early life ==
Lay was born in the Texas County, Missouri, town of Tyrone, the son of Omer and Ruth (née Rees) Lay. Lay's father was a Baptist preacher and Lay grew up in poverty after the family's general store failed. Later in Lay's childhood, his family relocated to Columbia, Missouri, and Lay attended David H. Hickman High School and the University of Missouri, where he studied economics, receiving a Bachelor of Arts in 1964 and a Master of Arts in 1965. He served as president of the Zeta Phi chapter of the Beta Theta Pi fraternity at the University of Missouri. He earned a Doctor of Philosophy in economics from the University of Houston in 1970.

He worked at Humble Oil as an economist from 1965 to 1968 in the Corporate Planning Department. (Note: On January 1, 1973, Humble Oil Refining merged with its parent, Standard Oil of New Jersey, to form Exxon Company, USA.) In 1968, Lay entered the Officer Candidate School for the United States Navy where, from 1968 to 1971, he rose to the rank of lieutenant and was the special assistant to the Navy Comptroller and Financial Analyst at the Office of Assistant Secretary of the Navy in the Department of the Navy at The Pentagon.

== Career ==
Lay worked from 1971 to 1972 as a technical assistant to commissioner and vice chairman (federal energy regulator) of the Federal Power Commission and served as the energy deputy undersecretary for the United States Department of Interior until 1974. In 1974, he returned to the business world as an executive at Florida Gas Transmission and was president of Continental Resources from 1981 to 1982. In 1982, he joined Transco Energy Company, owner of the Transcontinental Pipeline, in Houston and held the positions of president, chief operating officer and director until 1984 when he became chairman and CEO of the Houston Natural Gas Company.

By the time energy was deregulated in the 1980s, Lay was already an energy company executive and he took advantage of the new climate when Omaha-based InterNorth (Note: In 1983, Northern Natural Gas, owner of the Northern Natural Pipeline merged with Arthur Belfer's Belco Oil & Gas Corporation to become the BelNorth Petroleum Corporation.) bought his company Houston Natural Gas and changed the name to Enron in 1985. (Note: Dynegy purchased Northern Natural Pipeline from Enron in November 2001 and then sold it in July 2002 to Warren Buffett's Berkshire Hathaway.)

He was also a member of the board of directors from 1993 to 2001 of Eli Lilly and Company and a director at Texas Commerce Bank. In 1996 he held negotiations to replace Robert E. Allen as the CEO of AT&T.

=== Political involvement ===
Lay was a friend of the Bush family, including former president George H. W. Bush. He made monetary contributions, led several committees in the Republican Party and was co-chairman of Bush's 1992 re-election committee. As President, Lay flew Bush and his wife to Washington on an Enron corporate plane. In December 2000, Lay was mentioned as a possible candidate for either United States Secretary of Energy or Secretary of the Treasury under George W. Bush. He was not nominated because it was decided that the administration already included too many energy businessmen from Texas.

Lay additionally had friendly relations with the Republican politicians Gerald R. Ford, Dick Cheney, and James A. Baker III as well as the Democratic politicians Bill Clinton and Ann Richards. He encouraged John Ashcroft to campaign in the 2000 Republican Party presidential primaries, although this was partially to ensure him as a spoiler candidate to help Bush win the race.

From 1989 to 2002, Lay's political contributions totaled $5.8 million, with 73% going to Republicans, and 27% going to Democrats. From 1999 to 2001, he gave $365,410 to the Republican Party.

=== Enron bankruptcy and trial ===
Lay's company, Enron, went bankrupt in 2001. At the time, this was the biggest bankruptcy in U.S. history. In total, 20,000 employees lost their jobs and in many cases their life savings. Investors also lost billions of dollars. On July 7, 2004, Lay was indicted by a grand jury in Houston, Texas, for his role in the company's failure. Lay was charged, in a 65-page indictment, with 11 counts of securities fraud, wire fraud, and making false and misleading statements. The trial of Kenneth Lay and Jeffrey Skilling commenced on January 30, 2006, in Houston.

Lay insisted that Enron's collapse was due to a conspiracy waged by short sellers, rogue executives, and the news media. On May 25, 2006, Lay was found guilty on six counts of conspiracy and fraud by the jury. In a separate bench trial, Judge Lake ruled that Lay was guilty of four additional counts of fraud and making false statements. Sentencing was scheduled for September 11, 2006, and rescheduled for October 23, 2006.

== Death ==
Lay died on July 5, 2006, while vacationing in Colorado. The Pitkin County Sheriff's Department confirmed that officers were called to Lay's house in Snowmass, Colorado, near Aspen at 1:41 am Mountain Daylight Time. Lay was taken to Aspen Valley Hospital, where he was pronounced dead at 3:11 am MDT. The autopsy indicated that he died of a heart attack brought on by coronary artery disease, and found evidence that he had suffered a previous heart attack.

A private funeral for about 200 people was held in Aspen four days after his death. His body was cremated and his ashes were buried in an undisclosed location in the mountains. A memorial service was held a week after his death at the First United Methodist Church in Houston. It was attended by over 1,000 guests, including George H. W. Bush and James Baker. Conspiracy theories emerged regarding Lay's death, alleging that it was faked.

On October 17, 2006, the conviction was overturned due to abatement ab initio, a legal doctrine which says the death of a defendant during an appeal results in a vacated judgment. The government opposed Lay's attorneys' motions of appeal. The United States Department of Justice issued a statement saying it remained committed to pursuing all available legal remedies for victims of the fraud.

== Personal life ==
At the time of his death, Lay had been married to his second wife, Linda, since 1982. Both Linda and his first wife, Judith, supported Lay through the trial and made appearances at court. Kenneth Lay had two children, three stepchildren, and twelve grandchildren.

== See also ==
- Timeline of the Enron scandal
- Jeffrey Skilling
- Richard Kinder
- David L. Sokol
- Northern Natural Gas Building
- Texas Commerce Bank Headquarters
- Texas Commerce Tower
- Enron Complex
- Lou Pai
