= Trial of Kenneth Lay and Jeffrey Skilling =

Criminal trial of former Enron Corporation executives

The trial of Kenneth Lay, former chairman and CEO of Enron, and Jeffrey Skilling, former CEO and COO, was presided over by federal district court Judge Sim Lake in the Southern District of Texas in 2006 in response to the Enron scandal.

== Timeline ==
- The trial began on January 30, 2006.
- Opening arguments
  - The defense argued there was much "wickedness", and pressure led to confessions by company leaders, and failure of "market confidence" led to the financial crisis. According to the East Bay Times, the defense "went so far as to suggest 13 of the 16 Enron executives who have pleaded guilty to federal crimes were innocent but caved in to intense pressure from federal prosecutors."
  - The prosecution argued that leaders lied to Wall Street and investors about "crumbling finances".
- Eight former Enron executives testified, the star witness being Andrew Fastow, against Lay and Skilling, their former employers.
- The jury reached its verdict on May 25, 2006, convicting both Lay and Skilling. Lay was also convicted by Sim Lake of charges in a separate bench trial.
- Lay died on July 5, 2006, and his convictions were vacated on October 17, 2006.
- Sentencing of Skilling took place on October 23, 2006.

== Witnesses ==
(see U.S. DOJ list)

In order of appearance:

- Ken Rice
- Wesley Colwell – Former Enron North America chief accountant
  - "illegally" moved money out of company reserves to cover internal estimates
- Wanda Curry – chief accounting officer of Enron North America prior to Wesley Colwell
  - displaced by Colwell, "not capable of making aggressive accounting decisions"
  - U.S. District Judge Sim Lake did not allow prosecutors to get into details about the transaction – year-end 1999 electricity trading deal with Merrill Lynch – that prompted J. Clifford Baxter (Enron's single suicide) to displace Curry for Colwell
- Timothy Belden
  - West Coast energy trading profits
- David Delainey – ex-CEO of Enron's trading unit, Enron North America
  - Skilling coached for big meeting with analysts on January 25, 2001
  - Raptor accounts
  - Enron Energy Services (EES), February 2001, chaotic, disarray, gushing red ink
  - lost receivables moved from EES to Enron North America trading division
  - folding EES losses into Enron Wholesale Services
  - EES never profitable
- Kevin Hannon

== Lawyers ==
Defense

- Michael Ramsey
- Bruce Collins
- Chip Lewis
- George McCall 'Mac' Secrest
- Mark Holscher
- Daniel Petrocelli
- Jason Oppenheim
- Randy Oppenheimer
- Ron Woods

Prosecution

- Sean Berkowitz
- Kathryn Ruemmler
- John Hueston
- Cliff Stricklin
- Robb Adkins
- Andrew Stolper

== Outcome ==
The jury rendered its verdict on May 25, 2006. Sentencing took place on October 23, 2006.

- Skilling was convicted on 19 of 28 counts of securities fraud and wire fraud and acquitted on the remaining nine, including charges of insider trading. He was sentenced to 24 years and 4 months in prison, and could not be released before serving less than 20 years and 4 months. In addition, he would have to pay $630 million to the government, which included a $180 million fine.
  - In January 2009, the sentence was vacated by Judge Simeon Lake; Skilling would be re-sentenced later in the year. Any time already served would count towards the new sentence.
  - In June 2010, the U.S. Supreme Court threw out the honest services fraud statute in a unanimous decision; the case went before Lake again, to sort out which counts must be dismissed in light of the Supreme Court ruling, and to be re-sentenced.
  - In April 2011, the 5th Circuit Court of Appeals upheld Skilling's convictions, stating that the evidence to convict for conspiracy fraud was overwhelming, regardless of whether the honest services fraud theory had been raised or not.
- Lay was convicted of all six counts of securities and wire fraud for which he had been tried, and could have faced a total sentence of up to 45 years in prison; however, he died of a heart attack on July 5, 2006, while vacationing in Colorado prior to sentencing. Accordingly, the judge vacated Lay's conviction on October 17, 2006, since he died before he was sentenced and before all appeals could be exhausted.
- Sixteen people pleaded guilty for crimes committed at the company, and five others, including four former Merrill Lynch employees, were found guilty at trial.

In a separate bench trial, Judge Sim Lake ruled that Lay was guilty of four counts of fraud and false statements. These counts were also vacated because of Lay's death.
