= Lou Pai =

Enron executive (born 1947)

- 白露龍
- Born: June 23, 1947 (age 79); Nanjing, Republic of China
- Education: University of Maryland, College Park (BS, MS)
- Occupation: Business executive
- Employers: Securities and Exchange Commission (1970s–1986); Enron (1986–2001); Houston Pipeline Company; Element Markets (2005–2011); Midstream Capital (2012–present)
- Spouses: Lanna Lee (m. 1976; div. 2000) Melanie Fewell (m. 2001)
- Children: 3

Lou Lung Pai (Chinese: 白露龍; pinyin: Bái Lòulóng) (born June 23, 1947) is a Chinese-American businessman and former Enron executive. He was CEO of Enron subsidiaries Enron Energy Services and Enron Xcelerator, a venture capital division. He left Enron with over $250 million. Pai was the second-largest land owner in Colorado after he purchased the 77,500-acre (314 km^{2}) Taylor Ranch for $23 million in 1999, though he sold the property in June 2004 for $60 million.

Pai was not charged with any criminal wrongdoing in the Enron scandal and exercised his Fifth Amendment rights in regard to the subsequent Enron class action lawsuits. As a result of the lawsuit, Pai forfeited $6 million that was due to him from Enron's insurance policy for company officers to a fund for Enron shareholders.

Accounts of the Enron scandal have frequently portrayed him as a mysterious figure; a former Enron employee, interviewed in the 2005 documentary film Enron: The Smartest Guys in the Room, referred to Pai as "the invisible CEO".

== Background ==
Pai was born in Nanjing, China and came to the United States at the age of two. Pai obtained both his B.S. and M.S. in economics from the University of Maryland, College Park, where his father, Shih-I Pai, was an aeronautics professor. Pai worked for the federal government, primarily at the U.S. Securities and Exchange Commission, in the 1970s before joining Enron.

== Enron ==
Pai joined Enron in 1987, when it was just a regional energy supplier. He became one of (eventual) CEO Jeffrey Skilling's top lieutenants, primarily tasked with detailing and implementing Skilling's vision of transforming Enron into a de facto energy commodities-trading firm. During his Enron career, Skilling put Pai in charge of multiple Enron subsidiaries. Pai was CEO of the EES (Enron Energy Services) subsidiary from March 1997 until May 2001. The reasons for his resignation from Enron remain shrouded in mystery.

Despite a reputation for being extremely introverted, taciturn, and reclusive around the office, Pai also came to symbolize the legendary lavishness and excesses of Enron's corporate culture. Though married, Pai was known to spend inordinate amounts of time during and after working hours in Houston-area strip clubs, use the Enron corporate jet for personal commuting, and charge several hundred dollars' worth of lunches for himself and accompanying staff to the corporate expense account until Chairman Ken Lay later prohibited it.

Between May 18 and June 7, 2001, Pai sold 338,897 shares of Enron stock and exercised Enron stock options that put another 572,818 shares on the open market. At the time, the price averaged $53.78 per share. This early sell-off of Enron stock had the benefit of shielding Pai from the insider trading charges leveled against other Enron executives who had also secretly sold off large amounts of stock before the company's ruinous finances were publicly known.

Pai's Colorado ranchland included the 14,047-foot mountain Culebra Peak. His neighbors reportedly referred to the ranch as "Mount Pai".

== Post-Enron ==
Pai was a founder and is a former chairman of Element Markets, a renewable-energy consulting firm. Through Element, Pai has invested in pollution emissions credits. Since then, Pai has emerged as a partner in Midstream Capital Partners LLC.

On July 30, 2008, Pai agreed to resolve civil insider trading charges against him with an out-of-court settlement of $31.5 million, including $1.5 million in civil fines and $30 million in restitution, to be deposited into a fund for shareholders harmed by Enron's bankruptcy. He continues to neither admit nor deny the Securities and Exchange Commission claims that he sold millions of shares of Enron stock based on non-public information about the company's financial problems. It is one of the largest settlements in the history of the SEC's enforcement program dealing with an individual for alleged insider trading. As part of the settlement, Pai was also barred from serving as an officer or director of a public company for five years.

== Personal life ==
Pai's frequent strip club visits during his time with Enron led to an affair with a stripper Melanie Fewell (who was also married), and resulted in a pregnancy. Upon learning of the affair, Pai's then-wife of over 20 years, Lanna Lee, with whom he has two children, filed for divorce. To satisfy the financial terms of his divorce settlement, Pai cashed out approximately $250 million of his Enron stock just months before the company's stock price dramatically collapsed and it filed for bankruptcy protection. After the divorce, Pai and Fewell married.

Pai and Fewell together operated Canaan Ranch, located near metropolitan Houston, where they raised and trained dressage horses. They later moved from Sugar Land, Texas, to Middleburg, Virginia, and opened a second Canaan Ranch there, but, as of 2014, it is up for sale. More recently, Pai and his family have moved to Wellington, Florida.

== See also ==
- Enron scandal
- Danny Pang
