= Coben =

Coben is a surname, and may refer to:

- Cy Coben (1919–2006), American songwriter
- Harlan Coben (born 1962), American author
- Lawrence S. Coben (born 1958), American archaeologist
- Muriel Coben (1921–1979), Canadian baseball and curling player
- Sherry Coben (?), American television writer
