= Ross Sterling =

Ross Sterling may refer to:

- Ross S. Sterling (1875–1949), Texas governor
  - Sterling High School (Houston), named for the governor
- Ross N. Sterling (1931–1988), United States federal judge
