= Notis =

Notis is a given name. People with the given name include:

- Notis Sfakianakis
- Notis Marias
- Notis Mitarachi
- Notis Mavroudis
- Notis Botsaris
- Notis Peryalis
- Notis Giannakis

== See also ==
- Noti
- Freese-Notis
- De Furtivis Literarum Notis
- NOTIS
