= Northern Natural Gas Building =

High-rise building in Omaha, Nebraska, U.S.

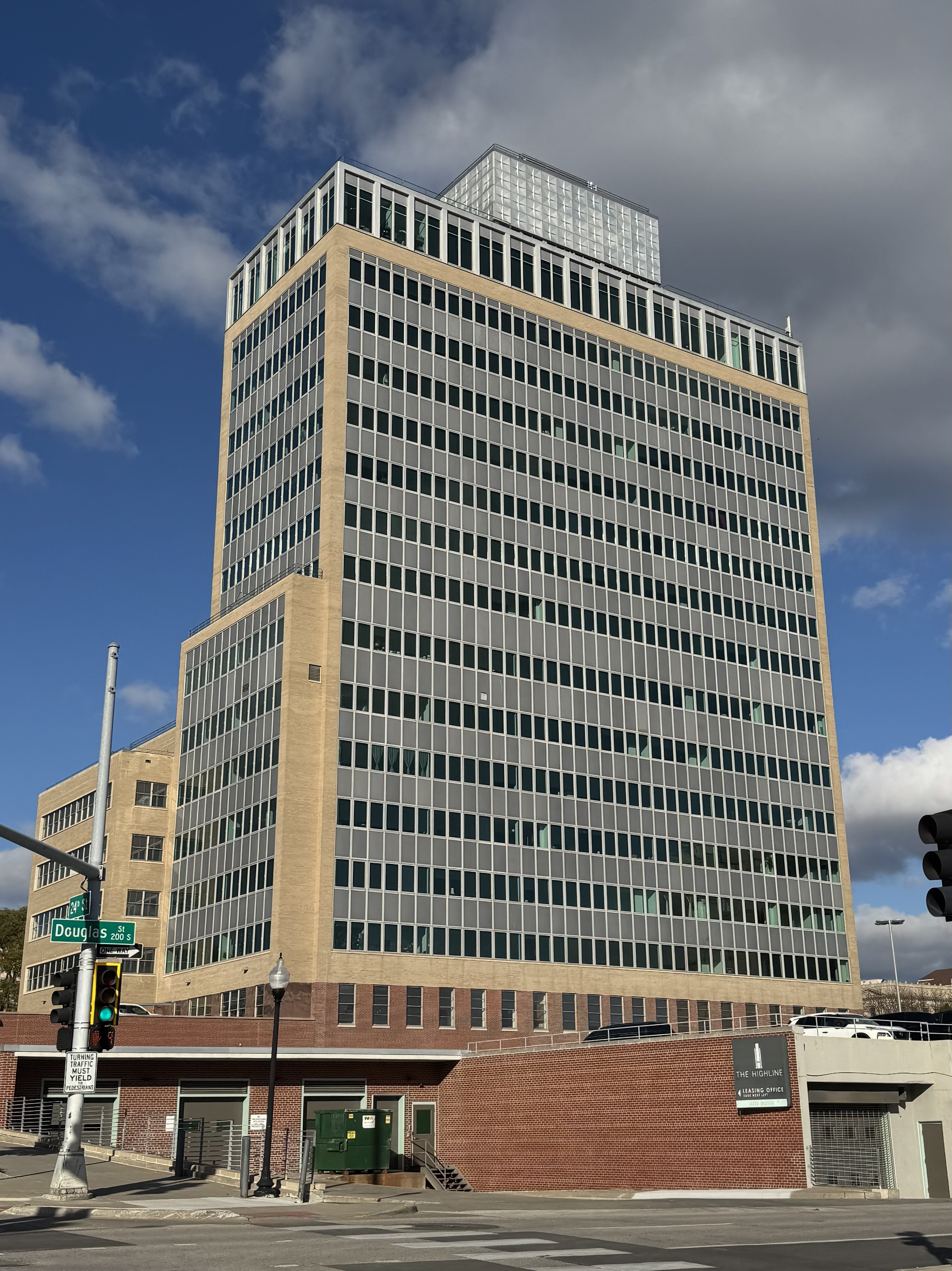
- Northern Natural Gas Building in 2025
- Interactive map of the Northern Natural Gas Building area

General information
- Status: Completed
- Location: Omaha, Nebraska, U.S.

Height
- Roof: 260 ft (79 m)

Dimensions
- Other dimensions: 3.77-acre (15,300 m^{2}) site

Technical details
- Floor count: 15
- Floor area: 259,000 sq ft (24,100 m^{2})
- Northern Natural Gas Building
- U.S. National Register of Historic Places
- Location: Omaha, Nebraska
- Coordinates: 41.2593°N 95.9461°W
- Built: 1950–1952
- Architect: Latenser & Sons
- Architectural style: Modern Movement
- NRHP reference No.: 09000649
- Added to NRHP: August 26, 2009

The Northern Natural Gas Building, also known as the 2223 Dodge Street Building, is a 260 ft (79 m), 19-story high-rise building located in the Park East neighborhood of Downtown Omaha, Nebraska, United States. As of 2013, the building is home to an apartment complex called the Highline. The building was added to the National Register of Historic Places in 2009.

The building was built in the early 1950s as a six-story building for Northern Natural Gas. The building was later expanded in 1958 with the addition of a fifteen story high-rise. After Northern Natural Gas's merger with Houston Natural Gas, the building was used as the headquarters for Enron until 1986. After Enron moved to Houston, Texas, the building was used as a regional headquarters for the company until 1990.

== History ==
On June 19, 1950, Northern Natural Gas announced that it would build a six-story building in Downtown Omaha. The building was topped-out in December of that same year. The building officially opened on January 7, 1952. Following its opening, in September 1952, Northern Natural Gas announced an additional expansion to the building. In April 1957, a fifteen story addition was announced, with construction beginning a few days later. The addition, built to the South of the building was completed in 1958.

In 1985, InterNorth purchased Houston Natural Gas and formed Enron. Enron remained in the building until July 1, 1986 when it moved to Houston, Texas. In 1988, Enron sold the building to an investment group. In spite of the sale, the building remained the regional headquarters for Enron until the early 1991, when Enron built a new facility in West Omaha.

In 2009, the building was listed on the National Register of Historic Places. In 2013, developer NuStyle redeveloped the building as an apartment complex known as Highline.

== Design ==
The Northern Natural Gas Building is made up of two buildings. The six story building to the North opened in 1952. The fifteen story high-rise building to the South opened in 1958. The buildings have a combined floor area of 259,000 sq ft (24,100 m^{2}). Both buildings were designed by Latenser & Sons.

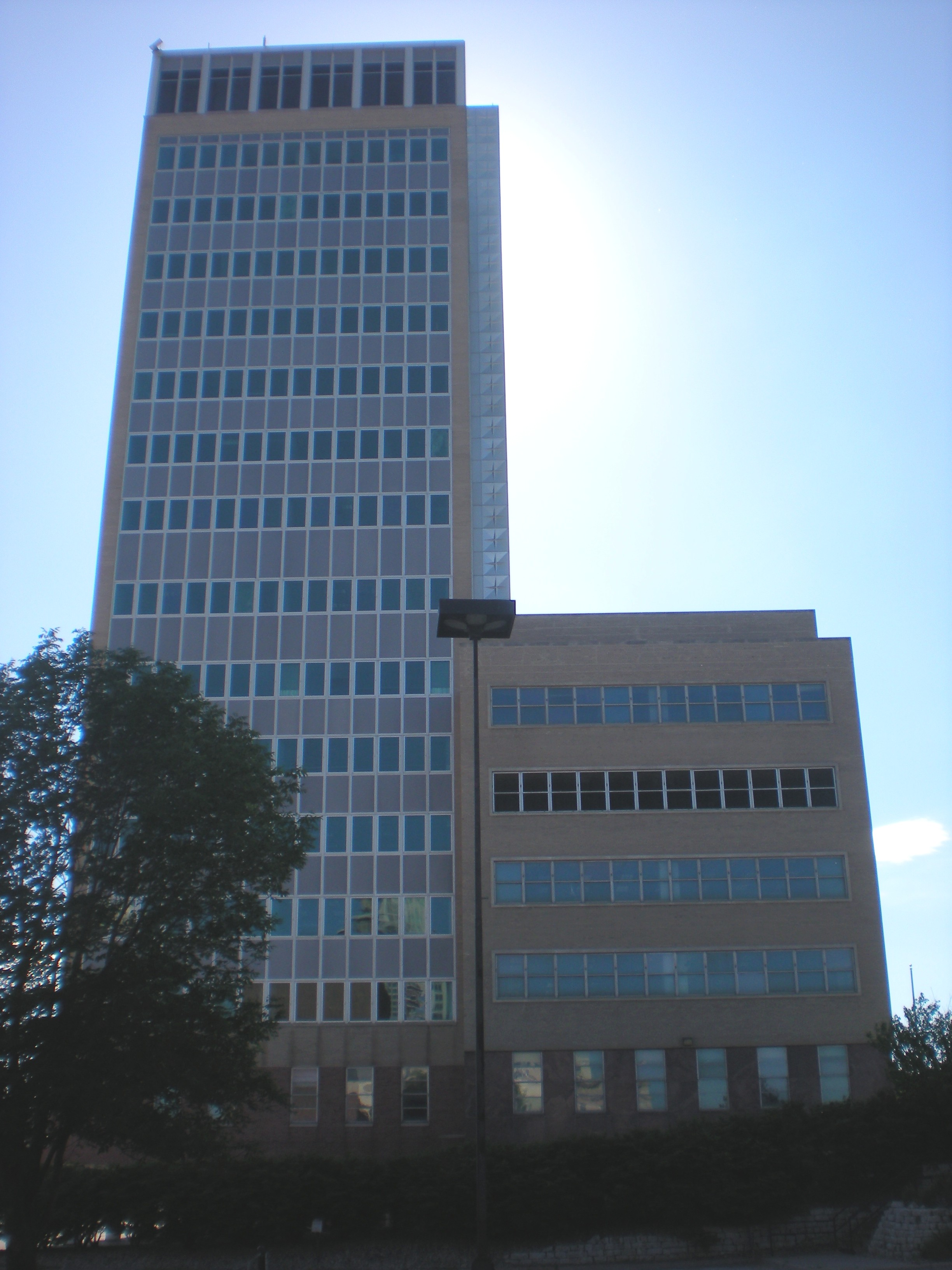
The East view of the Northern Natural Gas Building in Downtown Omaha.

== See also ==
- Economy of Omaha, Nebraska
- List of tallest buildings in Omaha, Nebraska
