= Drew B. Tipton =

American judge (born 1967)

Drew Tipton
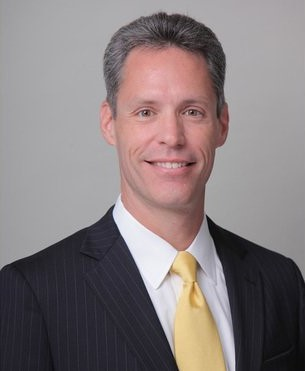

Judge of the United States District Court for the Southern District of Texas
- Incumbent
- Assumed office June 15, 2020
- Appointed by: Donald Trump
- Preceded by: Sim Lake

Personal details
- Born: Drew Barnett Tipton; 1967 (age 58–59) Angleton, Texas, U.S.
- Party: Republican
- Education: Texas A&M University (BA); South Texas College of Law (JD)

Military service
- Allegiance: United States
- Branch/service: United States Marine Corps; United States Marine Corps Reserve
- Years of service: 1988–1994
- Rank: Sergeant
- Unit: 1st Battalion, 23rd Marines, 4th Marine Division

Drew Barnett Tipton (born 1967) is a United States district judge of the United States District Court for the Southern District of Texas.

== Early life and education ==
Tipton's father and grandfather were both Baptist pastors. Tipton graduated from Angleton High School, earned his Bachelor of Arts in history and economics from Texas A&M University, and his Juris Doctor from South Texas College of Law.

== Career ==
=== Military service ===
Tipton served in the United States Marine Corps Reserve from 1988 to 1994 as a radio operator for an infantry battalion. He was honorably discharged with the rank of Sergeant.

After graduating law school, Tipton served as a law clerk to Judge John David Rainey of the United States District Court for the Southern District of Texas. He previously was in private practice with Marek, Griffin, & Knaupp and Littler Mendelson. From 1999 to 2020, he was part of BakerHostetler's Houston office and became a partner in 2002. His practice focused on complex employment law and trade secret litigation.

=== Federal judicial service ===
On January 15, 2020, President Donald Trump announced his intent to nominate Tipton to serve as a United States district judge for the United States District Court for the Southern District of Texas. On February 4, 2020, the nomination was sent to the Senate. Tipton was nominated to the seat vacated by Judge Sim Lake, who assumed senior status on July 5, 2019. The American Bar Association rated Tipton well qualified by a majority and qualified by a minority for the position. A hearing on his nomination before the Senate Judiciary Committee was held on February 12, 2020. On May 14, 2020, the nomination was reported out of committee by a 12–10 vote. On June 3, 2020, the United States Senate invoked cloture on Tipton's nomination by a 53–42 vote. Later that day, his nomination was confirmed by a 52–41 vote. He received his judicial commission on June 15, 2020.

=== Notable rulings ===
On January 26, 2021, Tipton enjoined an executive order issued by President Joe Biden, which halted the deportation of some undocumented immigrants for a 100-day period by temporarily blocking the President from overturning the prior administration's immigration policy known as Remain in Mexico. On February 23, shortly before the temporary stay expired, Tipton ruled that the same executive order exceeded Biden's presidential authority. On September 15, a three-judge panel of the United States Court of Appeals for the Fifth Circuit ruled that Tipton's ruling regarding the same executive order was incorrect, disagreeing with his reading of the Illegal Immigration Reform and Immigrant Responsibility Act of 1996 and his disregard for the long-standing tradition of executive procedural authority. On November 30, 2021, the full Fifth Circuit vacated that three-judge panel's decision, lifting the stay on Tipton's preliminary injunction.

On July 21, 2022, the Supreme Court of the United States agreed to hear the case and in the meantime left in place Tipton's ruling striking down the Biden policy, which meant that the Biden administration could not implement it while it waited for the Supreme Court to hear oral argument and issue a decision. On June 23, 2023, the Supreme Court overturned the ruling by an 8–1 vote on the grounds that Tipton did not have jurisdiction over the case.

In 2026, Tipton ruled that a Starr County district attorney, assistant district attorney, and county sheriff could not be sued by a woman who said she was wrongly arrested after attempting an abortion. Tipton ruled that the attorneys and sheriff were protected by qualified immunity.

== Memberships ==
He has been a member of the American Legion since 1999. He has been a member of the American Bar Association since 2000. From 2002 to 2008, he was a member of the Republican National Lawyers Association. Since 2003, he has been a member of the Marine Corps Association. Since 2010, he has been a member of the Federalist Society. He has been a member of the Second Baptist Church in Houston, Texas since 2008.

Legal offices
Preceded by Sim Lake	Judge of the United States District Court for the Southern District of Texas; 2020–present	Incumbent
