= Noti =

Noti may refer to:

- Noti, Oregon, a settlement in the US
- Notia, a village in Greece
- NotI, an enzyme
- Károly Nóti (1892–1954), Hungarian screenwriter

== See also ==
- Notti (disambiguation)
- Notis
