= Rebecca Mark-Jusbasche =

American businesswoman

Rebecca P. Mark-Jusbasche (born August 13, 1954, Kirksville, Missouri), known during her international business career as Rebecca Mark, is the former head of Enron International, a subsidiary of Enron. She was also CEO of Azurix Corp., a publicly traded water services company originally developed by Enron International. Mark was promoted to Vice Chairman of Enron in 1998 and was a member of its board of directors. She resigned from Enron in August 2000.

Since leaving Enron in 2000, she has been focused on water, energy technology, and agricultural projects.

== Personal life ==
Mark was born Rebecca Sue Pulliam in Kirksville, Missouri, and grew up on a pig farm. She attended William Jewell College in Liberty, Missouri, for two years. She then transferred to Baylor University in Waco, Texas, where she received a BA in psychology in 1976, and a master's degree in International Management in 1977.

Mark began her career in Houston, Texas, at First City National Bank. She married Thomas Mark, and had twin sons, but the couple later divorced. In 1982, she joined an energy company called Continental Resources, which eventually became part of Enron. In 1988, Mark entered Harvard Business School while working part-time for Enron, and received an MBA in 1990.

Mark married Michael Jusbasche in October 1999, and hyphenated her name to Rebecca Mark-Jusbasche. She has twin sons born ca.1986 to her brief first marriage, and after her second marriage in 1999, she adopted a two-year-old boy from Kazakhstan.

== Career at Enron ==
Mark started in a finance position for Enron's predecessor company's pipeline businesses in 1982. By 1986 she joined a small group within Enron developing cogeneration and independent power plants using natural gas. After a two-year stint working part-time for Enron while attending Harvard Business School, she returned to Houston and became head of the newly formed Enron Development Corp.

As Enron grew, Mark was responsible for its global power and pipeline assets outside of North America. Enron Development Corp. became Enron International in 1993, and Mark became Enron International's CEO in 1996, developing and operating power and pipeline assets around the globe and greatly expanding Enron's global portfolio.

In the late 1990s, conflict surrounding the company’s ideologies occurred amongst senior leadership and Mark’s sector of the business dissolved. The board eventually saw Mark's utility asset businesses as a drag on the company's return potential, and sought to further expand Enron's financial trading businesses while selling off its assets.

In 1998, Mark left Enron to form an international water company, Azurix, starting with the purchase of its main asset, British water utility Wessex Water. Azurix went public with an IPO in June 1999 but Enron remained a key stakeholder. According to Bethany McLean and Peter Elkind, authors of The Smartest Guys in the Room: The Amazing Rise and Scandalous Fall of Enron, with Azurix barely off the ground, Enron quickly "sucked out over $1 billion in cash while loading it up with debt." In August 2000, after Azurix stock took a plunge following its earnings report, Mark resigned from Azurix and Enron. Azurix assets, including Wessex, were eventually sold by Enron.

In 1998 and 1999, Mark was listed as one of Fortune's "50 Most Powerful Women" in American business.

== After Enron ==
Mark's exit from Enron in August 2000 was at a fortunate time, when Enron's stock was at its peak; she sold her stock for $82.5 million long before the company collapsed in 2001. She was never accused of wrongdoing in the ensuing series of scandals and prosecutions.

Since 2000, she has been president of Resource Development Partners, which invests in water, energy technology, and agricultural projects, including Dredgit Corporation, which specializes in marine dredging and public and private de-watering. She has been Chairman of Dredgit Corporation since 2013.

She owns and operates cattle ranches in New Mexico and Colorado, raising organic produce, grass-fed beef, and horses. She serves on the board of the Hermann Park Conservancy in Houston.
