= Azurix =

Water services company

- Type: Public company
- Industry: Water services
- Founded: 1998
- Headquarters: Houston, Texas
- Key people: Rebecca P. Mark
- Number of employees: 165

Azurix Corp. is a water services company, headquartered in Houston, Texas. The company owned and operated facilities in North America (mainly Canada), Europe, and South America. In 2007, Azurix was awarded a $165 million claim against the government of Argentina by an international arbitral tribunal; the company is currently involved in a dispute over Argentina's refusal to pay the claim.

== Background ==
Azurix was formed when Enron Corporation purchased British company Wessex Water in 1998. In June 1999, it was part-floated on the NYSE stock exchange, with Enron retaining 34% ownership. The company was formed with an IPO of $800 million and an opening stock price of $22.00, which fell to $2.00 within two years. The business was a disaster for Enron, and in April 2001 Enron announced it would break up Azurix and sell its assets. Enron eventually sold Azurix North America and Azurix Industrial Operations to American Water Works for $141.5 million.

== Leadership ==
The company was run by Rebecca P. Mark until her resignation in 2000; upon her resignation, John L. Garrison became chairman and CEO.

== Azurix in Argentina ==
Azurix is known in particular for operating in Argentina, where in June 1999 it bid $438m to win a 30-year concession covering two of the three regions of the Buenos Aires Province (excluding the Buenos Aires city concession, which is run by Suez). In October 2001, Azurix announced it would withdraw from the contract as of January 2002, accusing the regional government of "serious breaches", and later filed a compensation claim with the ICSID ("Azurix Corp. v. Argentine Republic (Case No. ARB/01/12)"). The concession was terminated in March 2002; in 2007 the ICSID awarded Azurix $156m in compensation (substantially less than the $620m Azurix originally invested and subsequently claimed in damages). In September 2009, the ICSID Ad Hoc Annulment Committee affirmed the award, rendering the arbitration final.

Argentina has not complied with the ICSID ruling and is in violation of US trade law, which states that an arbitration award issued by an ICSID tribunal is “final and binding on the parties, and each party must carry out the provisions of any award without delay (article VII, section 6).”

Azurix maintains a second arbitration case for its prior investment in the Province of Mendoza, Argentina which was suspended as of August 3, 2010.

As a result of Argentina's refusal to pay the Award, in December 2009 Azurix filed a petition with the Office of the United States Trade Representative (USTR) to review Argentina's eligibility to participate in the US Generalized System of Preferences (GSP) program. In the context of the 2009 review of the GSP program, USTR accepted Azurix's petition to review whether Argentina met the criteria related to enforcement of arbitral awards.

In August 2010, the Office of the United States Trade Representative (USTR) announced it would hear Azurix's petition regarding Argentina, in connection with the 2009 GSP Annual Review to modify the GSP status of certain beneficiary developing countries (BDC's) because of country practices.

In a filing prepared in advance of a September 28, 2010 GSP Subcommittee hearing Azurix stated, "Argentina has refused to enforce, through voluntary payment, a final and substantial arbitral award in favor of Azurix. Under these circumstances, U.S. law dictates the removal of GSP benefits for Argentina."

At the September 28, 2010, GSP Subcommittee hearing, Azurix formally called for the removal of Argentina's benefits under the generalised system of preferences (GSP).

In oral testimony, attorneys for Azurix, told the subcommittee that Argentina's refusal to comply with the 2006 ICSID award—which was upheld by an annulment committee last September—undermines the "very integrity of the foreign investment legal regime" and has an "erosive effect" on the ICSID Convention.

As of July 31, 2010, Azurix was owed more than $220 million by the Republic of Argentina.

== Wessex acquisition ==
Enron acquired the British water utility Wessex Water in July 1998 with an all-cash purchase of $2.4 billion. This formed the core of Azurix and its main asset. Wessex was one of the most profitable utility companies operating in the UK, earning $232 million profit on $436 million in revenues the year before its sale to Enron. However, the British regulators required the company to cut its rates by 12% starting in April 2000 and an upgrade was required of the utility's aging infrastructure, estimated at costing over a billion dollars. By the end of 2000 Azurix had an operating profit of $100 million and $2 billion in debt. Azurix subsequently sold its interest in Wessex Water in May 2002 to YTL Corporation of Malaysia.

== Other business ==
Between 1999 and 2002, Azurix owned and operated a 30-year water and wastewater concession in Cancun, Mexico. In addition, Azurix took ownership positions in several joint ventures in Mexico and, in April 2000 Azurix won a BOT contract in Accra, Ghana.

Azurix created Waterdesk.com, an online eBusiness website that provides transactions online for the water industry in Europe. The weather was featured for the United States within these portals was done by Freese-Notis Weather with a series of maps outlining conditions for users. Additional news feeds were provided with a series of headline news sections by Comtex news services.

Exchange users were to utilize accounts online for the exchanging of water rights contracts as financial instruments. Additionally, the intent was also to provide risk management for water contract buyers and sellers. This area represented an expansion of EnronOnline to the water business. Some companies in the energy business also rely on water contracts for operations.

Azurix also created Water2Water.com for Latin American businesses to do business with Azurix online. Right before Rebecca Mark's departure, a pilot program in the Lower Rio Grande was commenced.
