= Daniel M. Petrocelli =

American lawyer

- Born: August 15, 1953 (age 73); East Orange, New Jersey, U.S.
- Education: University of California, Los Angeles (BS); Southwestern University (JD)
- Occupation: Lawyer
- Spouse: Alison Sanders

Daniel M. Petrocelli (born August 15, 1953, in East Orange, New Jersey) is a partner at O’Melveny & Myers LLP and the Chair of the firm’s Trial Practice Committee. Petrocelli is known in part for his work in a 1997 wrongful death civil suit against O. J. Simpson, for representing Enron CEO Jeffrey Skilling, and for his leading role in defeating the US Department of Justice’s attempt to block the merger of AT&T and Time Warner.

== Early life and education ==
Petrocelli is a graduate of University of California, Los Angeles, with a degree in economics (he began as a music major but switched to economics after two years), and then moved on to the Southwestern University School of Law in Los Angeles where he received his Juris Doctor in 1980. He graduated first in his class from Southwestern and was also editor-in-chief of the Southwestern Law Review.

== Career ==
Petrocelli first gained national media exposure in 1997 when, as a partner at the law firm Mitchell, Silberberg & Knupp, he represented Fred Goldman, the father of murder victim Ron Goldman, in a wrongful death civil suit against O. J. Simpson. Petrocelli successfully argued the case, in spite of Simpson's 1995 acquittal in the related 1994 criminal murder case, and a jury awarded the Goldman family $8.5 million in damages. His book about the case, Triumph of Justice: The Final Judgment on the Simpson Saga (1998), written with co-author Peter Knobler, became a national bestseller.

Petrocelli also served as an attorney for Don Henley and Glenn Frey in the lawsuit filed against them by former Eagles band member Don Felder.

In 2001, Petrocelli took on attorney Bert Fields in Los Angeles Superior Court in the case of Stephen Slesinger Inc. v The Walt Disney Company, which remains active and is the longest-running case in that court's history, having been filed in 1991. Petrocelli won dismissal of the case after Fields had won a $200 million preliminary judgment but was forced to withdraw. The case concerned merchandising royalties paid by Disney to the heirs of Stephen Slesinger, a branding pioneer who obtained merchandising rights from Pooh author A.A. Milne in 1929. The clash between the two famous attorneys was covered in depth by Joe Shea of The American Reporter, an online daily newspaper that now offers an archive of 28 articles about the case with an extensive discussion of Petrocelli's role.

Petrocelli's next high-profile client was former Enron CEO Jeffrey Skilling, whom Petrocelli has represented since 2004, who was tried on charges of fraud and insider trading in 2006. Even though he had never previously handled a criminal case, Petrocelli became Skilling's lead defense counsel. Despite his defense, for which Skilling still owes a reported $30 million, a jury found Skilling guilty of nineteen out of the twenty-eight counts against him, including one count of conspiracy, one count of insider trading (although he was acquitted of the other nine counts of this particular charge), five counts of making false statements to auditors, and twelve counts of securities fraud. For these crimes, Skilling was sentenced to serve over 24 years in federal prison. In 2013 Petrocelli successfully negotiated a 10-year reduction to the original term, reducing Skilling's term to 14 years.

In December 2009, Petrocelli was retained by boxing celebrity Manny Pacquiao to sue Floyd Mayweather Jr., Floyd Mayweather Sr., Roger Mayweather, Oscar De La Hoya, and Richard Schaefer for false and defamatory statements accusing Pacquiao of taking performance-enhancing drugs. Filed in Nevada, the case sought compensatory and punitive damages in excess of $75,000, which according to Petrocelli was simply the minimum that one has to allege in order to sue in federal court, and that the actual damages to Pacquiao’s reputation were in the tens of millions of dollars, excluding punitive damages.

Petrocelli represented Donald Trump and Trump University in a pair of class actions in San Diego federal court alleging thousands of customers were deceived into paying for real estate seminars and mentoring. This litigation took place in the midst of the 2016 presidential election and was ultimately settled during the presidential transition.

In October 2017, The New York Times published an article stating that Petrocelli represented Harvey Weinstein in 2004 against actress Ashley Matthau, who stated that Weinstein sexually assaulted her in his hotel room.

He served as lead trial counsel for both AT&T and Time Warner, defending the companies $100 billion merger against claims by the Department of Justice’s Antitrust Division that the transaction would harm competition and should be blocked. US District Judge Richard Leon rejected the government’s case and denied its bid to block the merger. The merger closed on June 14, 2018 and the DOJ appealed the ruling in July. In February 2019, the U.S. Court of Appeals for the D.C. Circuit unanimously denied the government’s appeal, affirming Judge Leon's decision in its entirety.

In late November 2021, the Houston Chronicle reported he was representing Travis Scott as lead defense counsel in the criminal investigation and civil lawsuits surrounding the Astroworld Festival crowd crush.

In April 2023, Petrocelli represented Disney in filing a lawsuit seeking declaratory relief in order to prevent Florida Governor Ron DeSantis from taking actions to impair Disney's contract with the Reedy Creek Improvement District, as well as to issue orders enjoining the governor from enforcing the dissolution of the district.
