= Teesside power station =

Natural gas-fired power station in North Yorkshire, England

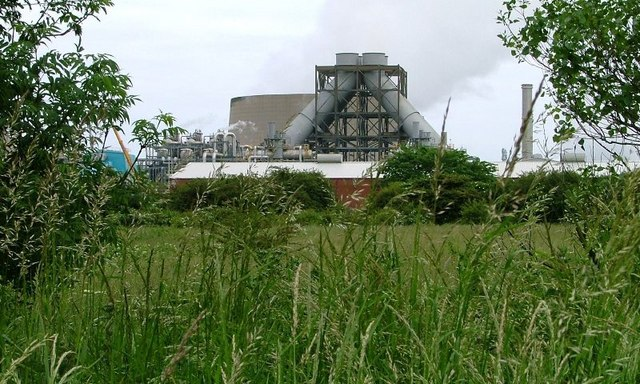
- Teesside Power Station; Viewed from the west in June 2006
- Country: England
- Location: Wilton, Redcar & Cleveland, North Yorkshire
- Coordinates: 54.576838°N 1.120417°W
- Status: Decommissioned
- Commission date: 1993
- Decommission date: 2015
- Owners: Enron (1993-2002); PX Ltd (2002-2008); GDF Suez (2008-2015)

Thermal power station
- Primary fuel: Natural gas
- Cooling source: Fresh

Power generation
- Nameplate capacity: 1875 MW

External links
- Commons: Related media on Commons

Teesside Power Station is a former gas-fired power station, in Redcar & Cleveland, England. Situated near the Wilton chemical complex, the station had combined cycle gas turbines (CCGTs) and open cycle gas turbines (OCGTs), however in 2011 the operation of the CCGT part of the station was suspended, and in 2013 the owners announced its closure and plans to demolish it. Prior to the suspension, the station had a generating capacity of 1875 megawatts (MW), making it the largest of any CCGT power station in Europe. The station could meet almost 3% of the electricity demand for England, Wales and Scotland. Opened in 1993, the station was initially operated by Enron but moved into the hands of PX Ltd after the Enron scandal of 2001, before being bought by Gaz de France and Suez in 2008. The station also worked as a cogeneration plant, providing steam for the Wilton complex.

== History ==
The power station was constructed on a 23-acre (93,000 m^{2}) site at the Wilton chemical complex near Middlesbrough in north east England. Construction of the station began in December 1990 and took twenty nine months to complete. The main contracted construction work was undertaken by Westinghouse and Wimpey, employing a largely local workforce of 3,000. The station was commissioned in April 1993. The station was originally owned and operated by US energy company Enron.

A visitor centre at the power station was opened by MP Mo Mowlam on 6 November 1998.

During maintenance closure in August 2001, an explosion in one of the power station's transformers killed three workers and injured another man.

After Enron's bankruptcy in 2002, the power station was sold to a management buyout. It was owned by Teesside Power Limited (TPL) and operated on behalf of its owners by PX Limited.

In October 2007 it was put up for sale by its private equity owners Cargill and Goldman Sachs, valued between £200 million and £300 million. On 25 February 2008 the station was acquired jointly by Gaz de France and Suez.

Plans for a £500 million upgrade of the station were granted planning permission in 2008. This upgrade would have consisted of replacing the existing generating equipment with four 300 MW gas turbines and two 340 MW steam turbines. This would retain the power station's current capacity. However, with no work having begun by 2010, a five-year extension to the permission was granted in April 2010.

Following a merger between GDF and International Power in 2010, the ownership of the site was shifted to the latter company.

On 1 April 2011, GDF surrendered 1,830 MW of transmission entry capacity (TEC) of the station and ceased operations of the CCGT element of the plant leaving the Open Cycle gas turbine as the only available machine, leaving the station with an operating capacity of 45 MW. This was due to the low cost of energy imports and a weak market in the UK, resulting in a need to save on operating costs.

MP for Middlesbrough South and East Cleveland Tom Blenkinsop also criticised the move, calling on Secretary of State for Energy and Climate Change Chris Huhne to "see to it that the [owners] ... are not allowed to pull the plug on this plant at this time." in relation to forthcoming end of the lives of UK coal and nuclear plants.

The owners, GDF Suez, announced in 2013, their intention to permanently close and demolish the plant. This was completed by early 2015.

In 2018, the local authority was told it had to pay £2.6m to GDF Suez due to a backdated re-evaluation of business rates for the site.

== Specifications ==
With a total generating capacity of 1,875 MW, the station had the largest generating capacity of any CCGT power station in Europe, although it had been the largest in the world at the time of opening. It was able to generate enough electricity to provide 3% of England, Wales and Scotland's combined power needs. The electricity was produced by a number of generators. These were: eight 152 MW Mitsubishi Heavy Industries Westinghouse 701DA gas turbines, each fitted with a Nooter Eriksen heat recovery steam generator, with supplementary firing; two 305 MW Mitsubishi Westinghouse steam turbines; and a single 43 MW LM6000 General Electric black start gas turbine. These generators were fuelled by natural gas, propane and naphtha. As of 1 April 2011, the station was only generating 45 MW after a partial mothballing of the station.

The gas fuel used in the power station was provided from a nearby gas processing plant. It was also connected to UK national gas transmission grid. Water used in the station's steam cycle was cooled by three cooling towers. Electricity generated at the station was distributed to the National Grid via 275-kilovolt (kV) substations built by ABB.

As well as generating electricity, the station also produced heat in the form of 800 tonnes (880 tons) of process steam per hour for the adjacent Wilton chemical complex, and 2,000 tonnes (2,200 tons) of gas liquids per day, in the form of propane, butane and hydrocarbons.
