= Allen Burroughs Hannay =

American judge

Senior Judge of the United States District Court for the Southern District of Texas
- In office August 6, 1975 – October 22, 1983

Chief Judge of the United States District Court for the Southern District of Texas
- In office 1954–1962
- Preceded by: Office established
- Succeeded by: Ben Clarkson Connally

Judge of the United States District Court for the Southern District of Texas
- In office August 12, 1942 – August 6, 1975
- Appointed by: Franklin D. Roosevelt
- Preceded by: James Burr V Allred
- Succeeded by: Ross N. Sterling

Personal details
- Born: Allen Burroughs Hannay; February 14, 1892 Hempstead, Texas, U.S.
- Died: October 22, 1983 (aged 91) Houston, Texas, U.S.
- Education: University of Texas School of Law (LL.B.)

Allen Burroughs Hannay (February 14, 1892 – October 22, 1983) was a United States district judge of the United States District Court for the Southern District of Texas.

== Education and career ==
Born in Hempstead, Texas, Hannay received a Bachelor of Laws from the University of Texas School of Law in 1913. He was in private practice in Hempstead and Houston, Texas from 1913 to 1930. He was a Judge in Waller County, Texas from 1915 to 1917. He was a state district judge in the 113th Judicial District of Texas from 1930 to 1942.

== Federal judicial service ==
On July 16, 1942, Hannay was nominated by President Franklin D. Roosevelt to a seat on the United States District Court for the Southern District of Texas vacated by Judge James V. Allred. Hannay was confirmed by the United States Senate on August 6, 1942, and received his commission on August 12, 1942. He served as Chief Judge from 1954 to 1962. He assumed senior status on August 6, 1975, serving in that capacity until his death on October 22, 1983, in Houston.

== See also ==
- List of United States federal judges by longevity of service

== Sources ==
Legal offices
Preceded by James V. Allred	Judge of the United States District Court for the Southern District of Texas; 1942–1975	Succeeded by Ross N. Sterling
Preceded by Office established	Chief Judge of the United States District Court for the Southern District of Texas; 1954–1962	Succeeded by Ben Clarkson Connally
