= Sim Lake =

American judge (born 1948)

Senior Judge of the United States District Court for the Southern District of Texas
- Incumbent
- Assumed office July 5, 2019

Judge of the United States District Court for the Southern District of Texas
- In office August 12, 1988 – July 5, 2019
- Appointed by: Ronald Reagan
- Preceded by: Ross N. Sterling
- Succeeded by: Drew B. Tipton

Personal details
- Born: Simeon Timothy Lake III; 1944 (age 81–82) Chicago, Illinois, U.S.
- Education: Texas A&M University (BA); University of Texas (JD)

Simeon Timothy Lake III (born in 1944) is a senior United States district judge of the United States District Court for the Southern District of Texas. His notable trials include the trial of Enron Chairman Ken Lay and former Chief Executive Officer Jeff Skilling.

== Education and career ==
Lake was born in 1944, in Chicago. He received a Bachelor of Arts degree from Texas A&M University in 1966, where he participated in the MSC Student Conference on National Affairs committee. He received a Juris Doctor from the University of Texas School of Law in 1969, graduating number one in his class. He was in private practice of law in Houston, Texas from 1969 to 1970. He was in the United States Army from 1970 to 1971 as a Judge Advocate General's Corps prosecutor in Vietnam. He was in private practice of law in Houston from 1972 to 1988, with the law firm of Fulbright & Jaworski LLP.

=== Federal judicial service ===
Lake was nominated by President Ronald Reagan on March 30, 1988, to a seat on the United States District Court for the Southern District of Texas vacated by Judge Ross N. Sterling. He was confirmed by the United States Senate on August 11, 1988, and received commission on August 12, 1988. He assumed senior status on July 5, 2019.

== Notable cases ==
Besides the Enron cases, Lake has participated in other notable cases:

- In 2004, he ordered the Bible removed from a display on the grounds of the Harris County Civil Courthouse.
- In 1999, he ordered the Houston Independent School District to pay private school tuition for a disabled student it could not accommodate.
- In 1997, he directed an acquittal and mistrial of Stanislaw Burzynski on three dozen counts of fraud after a jury deadlocked on the fate of the doctor who used unproven therapies to counter act cancer progression, to which he had many patients with positive results.

On October 23, 2006, Lake sentenced Enron executive Jeffrey Skilling to the minimum possible sentence under federal guidelines, 24 years, with significantly less time actually expected to be served by Skilling. Lake imposed this rather lenient sentence despite federal laws that would have allowed for a significantly longer prison sentence.

In April 2013, Judge Lake ruled that videos showing cruelty to animals are protected by the First Amendment to the United States Constitution despite laws against cruelty to animals and evidence that cruelty to animals can be a precursor to cruelty to human beings as well as murder. A petition has been launched to reverse this ruling.

== See also ==
- List of United States federal judges by longevity of service

Legal offices
Preceded by Ross N. Sterling	Judge of the United States District Court for the Southern District of Texas; 1988–2019	Succeeded by Drew B. Tipton
