= Prisma Energy International =

Former subsidiary of Enron Corporation

Prisma Energy International Inc., was a former subsidiary of Enron Corporation, formed in 2003 to own and manage the majority of Enron's overseas assets, formerly known as "Enron International".

== History ==
Prior to its official organization, Prisma was referred to within Enron as "InternationalCo". Enron's original bankruptcy reorganization plan, presented in early 2002, would have created a company broadly similar to Prisma (known under the working name "OpCo Energy"), but including Portland General Electric and the energy trading business, both later divested separately. As one of the final steps in Enron's liquidation, following their 2001 bankruptcy, Prisma was sold to Ashmore Energy International Ltd., a unit of Ashmore Group Plc., in 2006. Prisma was structured as an 'offshore' United States corporation incorporated in the British Overseas Territory of the Cayman Islands, but with its headquarters in Houston, Texas. It served as a holding company for 15 gas and electricity businesses. Its subsidiary, Prisma Energy International Services LLC, employed approximately 125 individuals, most at its headquarters in Houston, Texas. Assets in which Prisma Energy managed an interest employed an additional 6,500 employees worldwide. Following its 2006 sale to Ashmore Energy International Limited, Prisma Energy International Inc. was merged/amalgamated with Ashmore Energy International Limited with Prisma Energy being the survivor company. In December 2006, Prisma Energy International Inc. changed its name to Ashmore Energy International and, subsequently, in May 2007 to AEI.

== Enron bankruptcy ==
According to the final restructuring plan submitted to bankruptcy court, Enron Corporation was dissolved at the conclusion of the restructuring process, and allowed Prisma Energy International to emerge as an independent company. Enron's creditors, who lost about $63 billion due to its massive bankruptcy, were expected to receive between 17 and 22 cents on the dollar in cash and in Prisma stock due to its parent company Enron's dissolution. Prisma Energy had three business segments: natural gas, electric power distribution, and power generation on four continents. The natural gas units process and supply liquefied petroleum gas (LPG) in Bolivia, Brazil, Colombia, and South Korea. The power distribution business consisted of Elektro Eletricidade, a Brazil-based company with 1.8 million customers. Prisma Energy's power generation units managed power plants in Europe and South America. As of 2006, Enron's bankruptcy case is still ongoing. Despite earlier plans to spin off Prisma as an independent, public company, Enron instead reached a deal to sell the business outright to a unit of the London-based Ashmore Group. On September 7, 2006, the sale of Prisma to Ashmore Energy International Limited was completed.

== Board members ==
Board members included:

- Ron Haddock, Executive Chairman and CEO
- John W. Ballantine
- Philippe A. Bodson
- Lawrence S. "Larry" Coben
- Dr. Paul K. Freeman
- Henri Philippe
- Robert E. Wilhelm
- Brent de Jong
- Patrick S. Kenney
