= InterNorth =

American energy company (1931–1985)

InterNorth Inc.
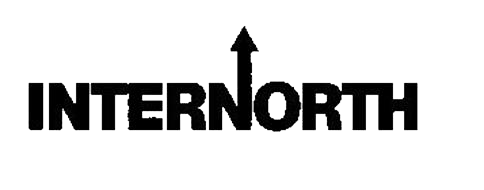

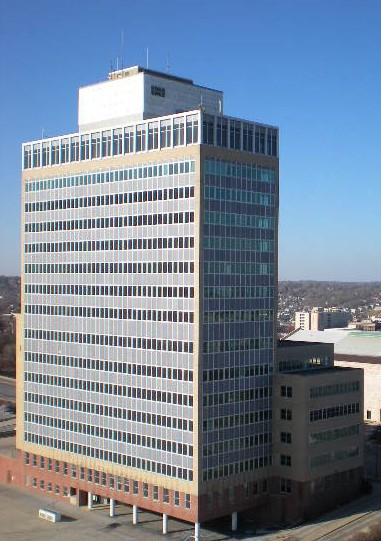
- The Northern Natural Gas Building, the former headquarters of InterNorth in Omaha, Nebraska.
- Formerly: Northern Natural Gas Company (1931–1980)
- Industry: Energy
- Founded: 1931; 95 years ago, in Omaha, Nebraska, U.S.
- Defunct: 1985
- Fate: Merged with Houston Natural Gas to become Enron
- Successor: Enron
- Headquarters: Northern Natural Gas Building, Omaha, Nebraska, United States
- Area served: United States

InterNorth Inc. was an American energy company headquartered at the Northern Natural Gas Building in Omaha, Nebraska, United States. It specialized in natural gas pipelines but also a force in the plastics industry, coal and petroleum exploration and production. It was a predecessor to Enron Corporation.

InterNorth was founded in 1931 as Northern Natural Gas Company. Over the years, it acquired several other subsidiaries, such as Northern Liquid Fuels Company, Northern Petrochemicals Company, Northern Propane Gas Company, Northern Border Pipeline Company, and People's Natural Gas. In March 1980, Northern Natural Gas reorganized as a holding company, InterNorth. They operated the largest natural gas pipeline in North America (approximately 36,000 miles of pipeline).

In 1980-81, the company launched an unsolicited takeover bid for Crouse-Hinds Company, which wound up being acquired by Cooper Industries the following year. The company continued to pursue expansion opportunities. In 1983, the company purchased the Belco Petroleum Company, a Fortune 500 oil exploration and development company founded by Arthur Belfer; and, in 1985, reached a deal, seen by some as overpriced, to acquire the smaller competitor Houston Natural Gas Company (HNG). InterNorth was an arbitrage target and acquired HNG as a poison pill.

Following its takeover of HNG, InterNorth was renamed to HNG/Internorth, a name it would keep for nine months before being rechristened Enron Corp. in April 1986.

Although intended to secure InterNorth's independence, the HNG takeover proved a "wag-the-dog" transaction: despite an initial plan for dual headquarters in Omaha and Houston, with InterNorth CEO Samuel Segnar in control, the company soon was based entirely in Houston and run by HNG's CEO, Ken Lay. Initially, Lay and his secretary were on board with design consultancy Lippincott & Margulies’s pitched name, Enteron, due to the positive connotations of the words "enter" and "on', though it was soon discovered to be a medical term for the intestines. The markets reacted with hilarity and within a month the name up for vote was changed to Enron.

The merged company was a target of corporate raider Irwin Jacobs of Minneapolis. Lay "borrowed" over $400 million from the employee stock ownership program to buy back Jacobs stock, so he could keep his job and cover other financial losses of Enron as early as 1987. Lay then froze the ESOP for seven years except for retirement or death benefits.

The most valuable asset of Internorth had been Northern Natural Gas, which was at one time the largest natural gas distributor in North America. After the bankruptcy of Enron, Northern Natural Gas briefly became part of Dynegy Corp, whose chairman, Daniel Dienstbier, had been president of Northern before Ken Lay seized control of Internorth. Dynegy then sold Northern to Warren Buffett's Berkshire Hathaway who moved it back to Omaha.
