= Daniel Scotto =

American financial analyst (1952–2018)

- Born: September 14, 1952; New York City
- Died: July 10, 2018 (aged 65); Virginia
- Occupations: Chairman, CEO CIO, Whitehall Financial Advisors LLC

Daniel Scotto (September 14, 1952 – July 10, 2018) was an American financial analyst. In August 2001, as an analyst with BNP Paribas, Scotto downgraded Enron securities from "Buy" to "Neutral". He took this action four months before the Enron accounting scandal was revealed that led to the company's bankruptcy. Scotto claims that he was fired due to this decision, a claim that is disputed by BNP Paribas.

== Biography ==
Scotto had previously spent the better part of three decades researching, analyzing and issuing reports on the Utility Industry. He worked at Standard & Poor’s in the Corporate Bond Rating division, with primary analytical responsibilities to assign bond ratings to electric, gas and telephone industries. From 1982-1988, Scotto served as Director of Corporate Bond Research for L. F. Rothschild and head of its utility analytical team. Mr. Scotto then moved to Donaldson, Lufkin & Jenrette (DLJ) where he was Director of High Grade and High Yield Corporate Bond research until 1994, and was then recruited by Bear Stearns as Managing Director of High Grade, High Yield, and Emerging Market Research as well as Senior Electric Utility analyst. In April 2000, Mr. Scotto moved to BNP Paribas as Director of U.S. High Grade Research and Senior Utility Analyst. Following the Enron report released while at BNP Paribas and his subsequent firing, in 2002 Mr. Scotto founded Whitehall Financial Advisors LLC to offer independent research, forensic financial analysis, consulting services to corporate clients, institutional investors and State and Federal legislators.

Scotto sponsored several landmark conferences dealing with Structural changes in the Electric Utility Industry.

Scotto also has extensive investment banking project experience – having served as the Senior Regulator/Company negotiator when the Long Island Power Authority (LIPA) acquired Long Island Lighting Company (LILCO). The list of other Investment Banking assignments also includes Western Resources “re-profiling,” restructuring of Tucson Electric, and representing Sale-Lease Back Bondholders (SLOB) in the bankruptcy of El Paso Electric. Daniel Scotto has been indoctrinated into Beta Gamma Sigma by Pace University as the 2008 Honoree for exemplifying the ideals of Beta Gamma Sigma.

Establishing Mr. Scotto’s public credentials in the timeframe leading up to the Enron affair, Institutional Investor Magazine published an article about him. They stated: “Investors are grateful to Scotto for consistently steering them clear of regions where the movement to disaggregate is well advanced.”

He died on July 10, 2018, in Virginia.
