= Element Markets =

Element Markets, LLC
- Type: Private
- Industry: Environmental Markets
- Founded: 2005
- Headquarters: Texas, USA
- Area served: United States
- Products: Environmental asset management Renewable Energy
- Number of employees: 47 (October 2009)
- Website: www.elementmarkets.com

Element Markets, LLC is a limited liability company that provides environmental asset management and compliance services to institutional clients in North America. Its services span the greenhouse gas, emissions, and renewable energy credit markets. Element Markets also develops renewable energy and greenhouse gas emission reduction (carbon offset) projects. Element Markets was founded in 2005 and is headquartered in Houston, Texas.

Element Markets is among the major companies in the environmental markets and has been recognized as such in industry publications, such as Environmental Finance and Energy Risk magazines.

In December 2008, Element Markets installed a 20,000-square-foot (1,900 m^{2}) solar photovoltaic power system on the roof of the Shops at Mission Viejo, a California mall owned by the Simon Property Group. At the time of installation, it was the largest rooftop solar project ever done by a mall operator.

On August 5, 2009, Element Markets completed the first-ever physical delivery of a Renewable Energy Credit (REC) futures contract on the Chicago Climate Futures Exchange.

In January 2022, the Rise Fund acquired a majority stake in Element Markets.
