= Northern Natural Pipeline =

Northern Natural Gas (NNG) is a natural gas pipeline which brings gas from the Permian Basin in Texas to the Chicago area, Wisconsin, Minnesota and the Upper Peninsula of Michigan. It is owned by MidAmerican Energy Holdings Company. Its FERC code is 59.
