= Freese-Notis =

Freese-Notis Weather
- Company type: Private
- Industry: Weather forecasting
- Founded: Ames, Iowa (1973)
- Headquarters: Des Moines, Iowa, USA
- Key people: Harvey Freese, Co-founder; Charles Notis Co-founder; D. R. Arthur, CIO
- Services: Meteorological; Doppler weather radar imaging DSL; Video weather services Forensic meteorology Commodities forecasts Zipcode weather data Weather forecasting services
- Website: www.weather.net

The Freese-Notis Weather company, commonly known as Freese-Notis, is a weather forecasting corporation. Headquartered in Des Moines, Iowa, United States, it has a global presence in the fields of meteorology, analytics, and related services, and also provides Internet Access DSL and Web hosting services. The company strengths for natural gas and energy markets now creates forecasts spanning industries such as media and web content found in the United States and foreign countries.

== Company history ==
Charlie Notis and Harvey Freese both were students at Iowa State University in 1973. The company originated on the Iowa State University campus in nearby Ames while they were post-grad students at Iowa State during the 1973 oil crisis.

The partnership was formalized on May 1, 1973, with a typewriter as its first piece of office equipment and acted as collateral for shares of stock. A friend of Harvey and Charlie suggest to name the enterprise "Freese-Notis Weather."

During the first couple years of existence, some of the radio listeners during the summer months would get confused when the radio announcer would introduce the Freese-Notis forecast that some thought was a "freeze-notice" forecast.

In 1995 Quote.com became one of the early users of content written by meteorologists highlighting weather with commodity symbols for easy access by traders. Shortly after that, both sponsored and subscriber based web pages were added to Successful Farming magazine's site, through the portal for the agribusiness and producer audience. Doppler weather radar imaging for the site called InterRAD provided a national, regional and local views across the contiguous states plus the District of Columbia but geared to the farmer. The service evolved to a second generation even more tuned to use with web portals after the year 2000 to include mobile applications and other kinds of weather map displays.

In 1995, other web sites added sponsored content pieces and subscription services. The Azurix company added content from Freese-Notis containing weather information related to water consumption and use. Irrigation users of the Azurix web site had a perspective on risk management with Freese-Notis weather providing a series of maps outlining the trends for their operations. Freese-Notis had also been the recipients of Christmas Baskets from Enron trading for appreciation of their weather forecasting services multiple times, even in 2001 making the final cut despite the troubles within that firm.

The general model later switched to either advertising based or sponsor based types of web content.
