= Ross N. Sterling =

American judge

Judge of the United States District Court for the Southern District of Texas
- In office May 7, 1976 – January 14, 1988
- Appointed by: Gerald Ford
- Preceded by: Allen Burroughs Hannay
- Succeeded by: Sim Lake

Personal details
- Born: Ross N. Sterling; January 18, 1931 Houston, Texas, U.S.
- Died: January 14, 1988 (aged 56) Houston, Texas, U.S.
- Education: University of Texas at Austin (B.A.); University of Texas School of Law (LL.B.)

Ross N. Sterling (January 18, 1931 – January 14, 1988) was a United States district judge of the United States District Court for the Southern District of Texas.

== Education and career ==
Sterling was born in Houston, Texas in the same year that his grand-uncle Ross S. Sterling became governor of the state. Sterling was in the United States Army from 1951 to 1954, and then received a Bachelor of Arts degree from the University of Texas at Austin in 1956 followed by a Bachelor of Laws from the University of Texas School of Law in 1957. He was a law clerk to John Robert Brown of the United States Court of Appeals for the Fifth Circuit from 1957 to 1958, and was thereafter in private practice with the Houston firm of Vinson and Elkins until 1976. Sterling was made a partner of that firm in 1969. Sterling was also active in Republican Party politics chairing a precinct in Houston and participating in state Republican conventions.

== Federal judicial service ==
On April 13, 1976, President Gerald Ford nominated Sterling to a seat on the United States District Court for the Southern District of Texas vacated by Judge Allen Burroughs Hannay. Sterling was confirmed by the United States Senate on May 6, 1976, and received his commission the following day. He served until his death on January 14, 1988, in Houston.

== Sources ==
Legal offices
Preceded by Allen Burroughs Hannay	Judge of the United States District Court for the Southern District of Texas; 1976–1988	Succeeded by Sim Lake
