= Houston Natural Gas =

American gas utility company (1940–1985)

Houston Natural Gas Corporation
- Industry: Energy
- Founded: May 29, 1940; 86 years ago in Houston, Texas, U.S.
- Defunct: 1985
- Fate: Acquired by InterNorth
- Successor: Enron Corporation
- Headquarters: Houston, Texas, United States
- Area served: Texas
- Key people: Robert D. Herring (CEO; 1967–1981, chairman 1973–1981); Kenneth Lay (CEO; 1984–1985)
- Parent: InterNorth

Houston Natural Gas Corporation (HNG) was an American gas utility headquartered in Houston, Texas, United States. The company was acquired by InterNorth Inc. in 1985, with HNG executives taking top positions at InterNorth. Following the transaction, InterNorth was renamed Enron Corporation and the company headquarters was moved from InterNorth's base in Omaha to the former HNG offices in Houston. HNG CEO Kenneth Lay became CEO of the newly formed Enron.

== History ==
HNG was founded in 1940 as a company to sell the gas produced by the Houston Pipe Line Company, after negotiations with Houston Gas and Fuel fell through. In 1956 HNG acquired the Houston Pipe Line Company and its assets for $36 million. At the time, HPL owned 761 miles of transmission lines crossing the Texas Gulf Coast and had been HNG's principal supplier since its founding.

In 1963 HNG acquired the Valley Gas Production Company and its pipelines, with the president, Robert R. Herring, joining the company as vice-president. He became president of the company in 1967, and chairman of the board in 1973.

In 1976 HNG exited the energy distribution market, selling its operations to Entex Energy, and began to diversify into industries outside energy.

Later, in 1984, the company fended off a hostile take over by rival energy company Coastal Corporation, in a successful attempt to fend off the takeover the board hired then Transco Energy president, Ken Lay, to manage the company. A year later, in 1985, Ken Lay negotiated the acquisition of HNG by InterNorth and his president position at the new HNG InterNorth, later known as Enron.
