= Lawrence S. Coben =

American archaeologist

Lawrence S. "Larry" Coben (born 1958) is an archaeologist who founded the ESCALA Initiative and the Sustainable Preservation Initiative. He is chairman, president and CEO of NRG Energy, a Fortune 200 integrated electricity and home services company.

== Archaeology/not for profit career ==
Coben is a consulting scholar and archaeologist at the University of Pennsylvania Museum of Archaeology and Anthropology and the founder and Executive Director of the Escala Initiative. His most recent work focuses on Inca imperial strategy and the archaeology of performance. He directs a multidisciplinary archaeological project in the Canete Valley of Peru and was director of a project at the monumental site of Incallajta in Bolivia. With Takeshi Inomata, he co-authored the book Archaeology of Performance: Theater, Power and Community. Richard Schechner described this work as "an important work integrating performance theory, forensics, and classical archaeology to describe and analyze not a "dead past" but pasts that continue to operate as rich repositories of living behaviors." Coben has published articles on the Inca, archaeological site museums, and the role of performance and spectacle in ancient society. Coben recently delivered a TED talk about alleviating poverty, empowering women and saving cultural heritage entitled "Build Futures, Save Pasts".

He also runs the aforementioned ESCALA Initiative. The ESCALA Initiative is focused on helping women entrepreneurs in developing countries build a better future for themselves, their families, and their communities. Through its 10-month formalized Business School and Capacity Building Program, ESCALA empowers women entrepreneurs to hurdle economic and social barriers as business owners. The comprehensive and proven curriculum teaches critical entrepreneurial and business skills through workshops and mentoring sessions that prepare students for success. All of the students have either started their own small business or plan to do so while enrolled in the program. They are engaged in a variety of industries such as textiles, food, and tourism. ESCALA presently works in Peru, Mexico, Tanzania, and Guatemala. This paradigm, designed by Coben, has been suggested by the Milken Institute as an optimal solution to preserve and develop Israel's cultural heritage Coben gave a TEDx talk on this subject in 2016. Coben Tedx Talk

Coben is an expert member of the ICOMOS International Scientific Committee on Archaeological Heritage Management ("ICAHM"). He is Chairman of ICAHM's Nominations Assistance Committee and Vice Chairman of its Standards Board. He was recently named to the jury of the prestigious Cotsen Prize in Archaeology

== Energy career ==
In addition to his academic work in archaeology, Coben has started and run numerous energy companies. He is Chairman of the Board, President and CEO of NRG Energy, the Fortune 200 integrated electricity and home services company. He was the founder and CEO of Tremisis Energy Corporation and was CEO of Tremisis's two eponymous publicly traded affiliates. Coben is on the board of Freshpet, and was an Advisory Partner of Morgan Stanley Infrastructure Partners. Coben was one of the founders of Catalyst Energy Corporation, one of the nation's first alternative energy companies. Catalyst was #1 on the Inc. Magazine Fastest Growing Public Company List for the years 1982-1986. He is chief executive officer of the New York Stock Exchange traded Bolivian Power Company, Ltd., Bolivia's largest private integrated electric generator and distributor. He was also a director of Prisma Energy and the Chilean utility SAESA, among other companies.

Coben is also an advisor to several politicians and groups on energy policy. Ambassador Dick Swett and he wrote the national energy policy for Senator Joseph Lieberman's 2004 presidential campaign. He is a member of the Department of Homeland Security's Sustainability and Efficiency Task Force and Cleantech and Green Business for Obama.

Coben wrote the Larry Coben energy policy and cultural heritage blog for the Huffington Post, and his own blog Energizing America, both of which discussed major energy policy and cultural heritage issues and comment on related news from around the globe.

== Education ==
Coben holds a BA in Economics from Yale University, a JD from Harvard Law School, and an MA and Ph.D in Anthropology (Archaeology) from the University of Pennsylvania.

== Selected publications ==
- Archaeology of Performance: Theater, Power and Community. Volume co-edited with Takeshi Inomata, published by Altamira Press (2006). Various personal contributions in this volume, including "Other Cuzcos: Replicated Theaters of Inka Power".
- 'Archaeological Reconnaissance in the Carabaya Region, Peru. In Advances in the Archaeology of the Titicaca Basin. Charles Stanish, Amanda Cohen, and Mark Aldenderfer, eds. Los Angeles: Cotsen Institute of Archaeology Press. With Charles Stanish (2005)
- The Museums' Objects. In Site Museums in Latin America. Helaine Silverman ed. University of Florida Press (2006)
- Incallajta, Performance Center of the Inkas: A Digital Reconstruction and Virtual Reality Analysis In From Space to Place: 2nd International Conference on Remote Sensing in Archaeology. Proceedings of the 2nd International Workshop, CNR, Rome, Italy, December 4–7, 2006, S. Campana and M. Forte eds. With Paul John Boulifard
- Some Roads Do Lead to Incallajta: The Double Road from Vacas. Ñawpa Pacha, Journal of Andean Studies, Volume 30, Number 1, pp. 53–64. (2010)
- Barter markets in the Pre-Hispanic Andes.. In Redistribution and Markets in Andean South America, ed. K. Hirth & J. Pillsbury, pp. 421–436. Dumbarton Oaks with C. Stanish (2012)
- Theaters of Power: Inca Imperial Performance. Doctoral Dissertation, ProQuest (2012).
- If all the world's a stage then what's an usnu?. In Inca Sacred Space: Landscape, Site and Symbol in the Andes Meddens, F., Willis, K., McEwan, C. and Branch, N. (eds), London: Archetype Publications (2014).
- Sustainable Preservation: Creating Entrepreneurs, Opportunities and Measurable Results. In Archaeology and Economic Development, edited by P. Gould and P. Burtenshaw, Public Archaeology pp. 278–287 (2014)
- Sostenibilidad y Preservación del Patriomonio Cultural: Nuevos Paradigmas, Nuevos Casos de Estudio. In El Patrimonio Cultural de America, Tomo II, Conservación y Uso Social. A Soberón Mora, M Rivera and M. Scatamacchia eds., pp. 103–117 (2014). With S. Cusicanqui Marsano
- Caminos Rituales, Caminos Utiles: El Sistema Vial en la Región de Pocona, Bolivia. In Proceedings of the Qhapaq Ñan Conference, L. Arkush and G. Marcone eds, (in press). With M. Muñoz
- Sustainability and Cultural Heritage. In Encyclopedia of Global Archaeology. C. Smith (ed) pp. 1521–1522 Springer (2014)
- Ushnu. In Encyclopedia of the Incas, G. Urton and A. Von Hagen (eds). Rowman and Littlefield (in press)
- The Inca enter of Incallajta in the Southeastern Andes. In Oxford Handbook of the Incas, A. Covey and S. Alconinin (eds), Oxford University Press (in press)
