= Jeffrey Skilling =

American businessman and felon (born 1953)

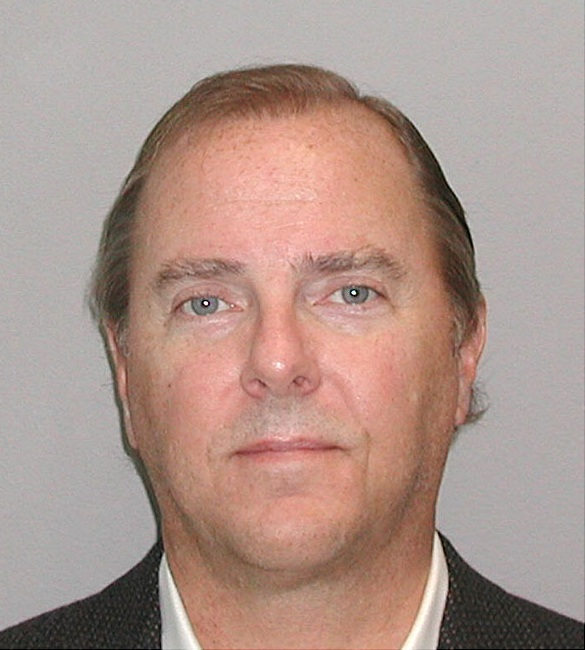
- Mug shot of Skilling in 2004
- Born: Jeffrey Keith Skilling; November 25, 1953 (age 72); Pittsburgh, Pennsylvania, U.S.
- Education: Southern Methodist University (BA); Harvard University (MBA)
- Occupations: Former CEO of Enron; Former Partner at McKinsey & Company
- Spouses: Susan Long (div. 1997) Rebecca Carter (m. 2002)
- Children: Three
- Relatives: Tom Skilling (brother)
- Status: Released
- Criminal charges: Conspiracy, securities fraud, false statement, insider trading
- Penalty: 14 years in federal prison (originally 24 years), $45 million fine; sentence reduced as a result of Skilling v. United States

Signature
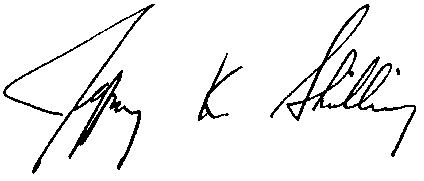

Jeffrey Keith Skilling (born November 25, 1953) is an American businessman who in 2006 was convicted of federal felony charges relating to the Enron scandal. Skilling, who was CEO of Enron during the company's collapse, was eventually sentenced to 24 years in prison, of which he served 12 after multiple appeals.

Skilling was indicted on 35 counts of crimes related to the Enron scandal. In 2006 he was found guilty of conspiracy, insider trading, making false statements, and securities fraud. He was sentenced to 24 years in prison and fined $45 million.

The US Supreme Court heard arguments in the appeal of the case in 2010, vacated part of Skilling's conviction, and transferred the case back to the lower court for resentencing.

In 2011, a three-judge panel of the Fifth Circuit Court of Appeals ruled that the verdict would have been the same despite the legal issues being discussed, and Skilling's conviction was confirmed; however, the court ruled Skilling should be resentenced. Skilling appealed this new decision to the Supreme Court, but the appeal was denied.

In 2013, following a further appeal, and earlier accusations that prosecutors had concealed evidence from Skilling's lawyers prior to his trial, the United States Department of Justice reached a deal with Skilling, which resulted in ten years being cut from his sentence, reducing it to 14 years. He was moved to a halfway house in 2018 and released from custody in 2019, after serving 12 years.

== Early life ==
Jeffrey Keith Skilling was born in Pittsburgh, Pennsylvania, on November 25, 1953, the second of four children of Betty (née Clarke) and Thomas Ethelbert Skilling, Jr. His father was a sales manager for an Illinois valve company. His older brother, Tom Skilling, later became chief meteorologist at WGN-TV in Chicago. Skilling grew up between New Jersey and Aurora, Illinois. When he was 16 years old, he worked at WLXT-TV (channel 60), a UHF television station in Aurora. He graduated from West Aurora High School and received a full scholarship to Southern Methodist University in Dallas, Texas, where he was a member of the Beta Theta Pi fraternity.

Skilling initially studied engineering before changing to business. After graduating in 1975, he went to work as a corporate planner for First City Bancorporation of Houston, Texas. He quit by 1977 to attend Harvard Business School. According to Skilling, during his admissions interview for Harvard Business School, he was asked if he was smart, to which he replied, "I'm fucking smart." This apparently so impressed the interviewer that it secured his place at the school. He earned his MBA from Harvard Business School in 1979, graduating in the top 5% of his class as a Baker Scholar.

After graduation, Skilling became a consultant at McKinsey & Company in the energy and chemical consulting practices. He eventually became one of the youngest partners in the history of McKinsey.

== Enron ==
As a consultant for McKinsey, Skilling worked with Enron during 1987, helping the company create a forward market in natural gas. Skilling impressed Kenneth Lay in his capacity as a consultant, and was hired by Lay during 1990 as chairman and chief executive officer of Enron Finance Corp. In 1991, he became the chairman of Enron Gas Services Co., which was a result of the merger of Enron Gas Marketing and Enron Finance Corp. Skilling was named CEO and managing director of Enron Capital and Trade Resources, which was the subsidiary responsible for energy trading and marketing. He was promoted to president and chief operating officer of Enron during 1997, second only to Lay, while remaining the manager of Enron Capital and Trade Resources.

During Skilling's management, Enron adopted "mark-to-market" accounting, in which anticipated future profits from any deal were accounted for by estimating their present value rather than historical cost. Skilling began advocating a novel idea: by promoting the company's aggressive investment strategy, the company didn't really need any "assets". This plan helped make Enron the largest wholesaler of gas and electricity, with $27 billion traded in a quarter. On February 12, 2001, Skilling was named CEO of Enron, replacing Lay. He was slated to succeed Lay as chairman as well in early 2002, but abruptly resigned six months later on 14 August 2001.

Skilling joked about the California energy crisis at one meeting of Enron employees by asking, "What is the difference between California and the Titanic? At least when the Titanic went down, the lights were on". Skilling later attributed the remark to frayed relations between Enron and California. His employees, meanwhile, plotted to keep the price of energy high in California.

On March 28, 2001, PBS's Frontline interviewed Skilling, where he claimed for Enron "We are the good guys. We are on the side of angels".

On April 17, 2001, Skilling made what became an infamous comment during a conference call with financial analysts. In response to fund manager Richard Grubman saying "You know, you are the only financial institution that can't produce a balance sheet or cash flow statement with their earnings", Skilling replied: "Thank you very much, we appreciate that... asshole."

In June 2001, Skilling spoke at the Commonwealth Club of California, where he was heckled by Global Exchange protesters wearing pig masks and was partially struck by a pie on stage. A documentary, The Pie's the Limit, was later made about the incident.

Skilling unexpectedly resigned on August 14 of that year, citing personal reasons, and he soon sold large amounts of his shares in the corporation. Then-chairman Kenneth Lay, who previously served as CEO for 15 years, returned as CEO until the company filed for bankruptcy protection during December 2001. When brought in front of congressional committees, Skilling stated that he had "no knowledge" of the complicated scandal that would eventually result in Enron's bankruptcy.

== Legal proceedings ==
Skilling was indicted on 35 counts of fraud, insider trading, and other crimes related to the Enron scandal. He surrendered to the Federal Bureau of Investigation on February 19, 2004, and pleaded not guilty to all charges. The indictments emphasized his probable knowledge of, and likely direct involvement with, the fraudulent transactions within Enron. About a month after quitting Enron, Skilling sold almost US$60 million of his stake in the company (in blocks of 10,000 to 500,000 shares), resulting in the prosecutors' allegation that he sold those shares with inside information of Enron's impending bankruptcy. Skilling's main attorney was Daniel Petrocelli, the 52-year-old civil litigator who represented Ron Goldman's father in his successful civil suit against O. J. Simpson for negligent death. Skilling spent $40 million in preparation for the trial, of which at least $23 million went to his defense lawyers' retainer. Skilling's younger brother Mark is an attorney and assisted his legal team during the criminal trial.

In April 2004, Skilling got into a scuffle with patrons of a cigar bar in New York City after a night of drinking. He was not arrested, but he and his wife, Rebecca, who was hurt during the scuffle, were transported to a hospital where a blood test showed Skilling had a blood-alcohol level of 190 milligrams per deciliter (0.19% BAC), as indicated in the government's motion to modify conditions of Skilling's pretrial release order. Prosecutors moved against Skilling, asking a judge to increase his $5 million bond to $7 million, restrict his travel to Texas and impose a curfew. They argued that Skilling violated his bond's terms by drinking excessively and failing to report his contact with police to federal pretrial services authorities.

The trial began on January 30, 2006, in Houston, despite repeated protests from defense attorneys calling for a change in venue on the grounds that "it was impossible to get a fair trial in Houston". Enron's bankruptcy, the largest in U.S. history when it was filed during December 2001, cost 20,000 employees their jobs. In addition, many of them lost their life savings. Investors also lost billions. Skilling and many of the company's executives had sold huge portions of their own Enron stock before the bankruptcy filing, making a substantial profit. On May 25, 2006, the jury returned with the following findings regarding Skilling:

- guilty on one count of conspiracy
- guilty on one count of insider trading
- guilty on five counts of making false statements to auditors
- guilty on twelve counts of securities fraud
- not guilty on nine counts of insider trading

In a front-page interview with The Wall Street Journal on June 17, 2006, Skilling claimed that he had been melancholic after the Enron bankruptcy and that he had considered suicide, but that his indictment actually ended his depression. He also claimed that the worst witness against him was himself, and that he would be able to survive a long prison term as long as he is given "something to do, something to accomplish" while in prison.

On October 23, 2006, Skilling was sentenced to 24 years and four months in prison, and was fined US$45,000,000 (equivalent to $71,867,778 in 2025). All of his convictions save one were ultimately upheld on appeal, as was his sentence. Skilling's request to remain free during appeal was denied by Judge Patrick Higginbotham of the Fifth Circuit Court of Appeals on December 12, 2006. In ordering Skilling's immediate imprisonment, the judge wrote, "Skilling raises no substantial question that is likely to result in the reversal of his convictions on all of the charged counts," although the order also noted "serious frailties" were possible in some (but not all) of the convictions.

Skilling began his sentence on December 13, 2006, and was housed at the Montgomery Federal Prison Camp, Maxwell Air Force Base, Montgomery, Alabama until 2018. According to the Federal Bureau of Prisons, he was scheduled for release on February 21, 2019, but on August 30, 2018 Skilling was released from prison and sent to a halfway house in Texas to serve out his prison sentence.

The Securities and Exchange Commission had sued Skilling for his misdeeds in February 2004, around the time that the criminal case was brought. The SEC case was stayed, however, pending resolution of the criminal case. On December 8, 2015, federal judge Melinda Harmon granted summary judgment to the SEC and permanently barred Skilling from serving as an officer or director of a public company.

Skilling was released from federal custody on February 21, 2019.

== 2008 events ==
Prior to the trial, attorneys for Skilling requested that the notes taken from FBI agents during interviews with Andrew Fastow be given to the defense. A number of inconsistencies in the notes were discovered soon after.

On April 3, 2008, Skilling's defense attorney, Daniel Petrocelli, argued with government prosecutors that Skilling's trial and the conviction itself was based on honest services fraud, which he said did not apply to Skilling. This argument was based on the idea that, even though Skilling committed illegal financial maneuvers, he did so in order to save the company and did not profit from it. This was cited as a possible basis for overturning some or all of his convictions; however, the chances of this were considered to be very narrow.

Experts believed Skilling's best chance was in citing a parallel appeals court decision that had dismissed guilty verdicts on three Merrill Lynch bankers accused of helping Enron to inflate profits.

On October 30, 2008, Skilling was moved to a low-security prison near Littleton, Colorado, as his original prison, FCI Waseca, was being converted to an all-female facility.

== Philosophy ==
Richard Dawkins' book The Selfish Gene was Skilling's favorite book and served as the foundation of his managerial philosophy. Skilling held, by his own interpretation, a Darwinian view of what makes the world work. He believed that money and fear were the only things that motivated people. Soon after being hired at Enron, he set up the Performance Review Committee (PRC), a twice-yearly process in which employees were publicly graded by management panels on a scale from 1 to 5, 5 being lowest. Ratings were ostensibly based on job performance and feedback from colleagues and supervisors, but in reality, the highest grades were typically assigned to people bringing in money to the company, and people with internal connections. Employees' bonuses often rested significantly on their ranking, and those with the lowest ratings were supposed to be fired. The rankings were assigned on a curve at Skilling's direction, meaning that ten percent of people had to be graded five, regardless of absolute performance. They were given two weeks to try to find another job at Enron or be fired. The scheme came to be known as "rank and yank". Skilling described the PRC process as "the most important process we conduct as a company".

Dawkins has distanced himself from Enron and Skilling, saying that Skilling misunderstood his book. Dawkins has said that he has never advocated selfishness as a means of progression.

== Supreme Court review ==
On October 13, 2009, the Supreme Court of the United States agreed to hear two questions presented by Skilling's appeal. The Court subsequently scheduled and heard argument March 1, 2010.

The first challenge by Skilling's defense was whether or not the federal "honest services fraud" statute (title 18 of the United States Code, section 1346) required the government to prove that Skilling's conduct was intended to achieve "private gain" (instead of being intended to advance his employer's interests); and, if not, if this statute is unconstitutionally vague. The Court heard two other cases about the same statute on December 8, several months before it heard Skilling's appeal: Black v. United States and Weyhrauch v. United States.

The second issue – "in-house judging" – was whether or not, when a presumption of jury prejudice arises because of the widespread, community effect of the defendant's alleged conduct, plus, widespread, inflammatory pretrial publicity, the government may rebut that presumption; and, if so, if the government must prove beyond a reasonable doubt that no juror was actually prejudiced.

In the arguments on March 1, the issue of jury selection received the most attention. Justices Stephen Breyer and Sonia Sotomayor seemed especially bothered by the questioning of one potential juror who reported that she had lost from $50,000 to $60,000 in the Enron debacle. "How can we be satisfied that a fair and impartial jury was picked when the judge doesn't follow up when the juror said, 'I'm a victim of this crime,'" Sotomayor asked. The government maintained that the judge and the selection process were appropriate. Sri Srinivasan, a partner at O'Melveny & Myers, was Skilling's Washington defense attorney, and Justice Department lawyer Michael Dreeben argued for the government.

On June 24, 2010, in an opinion by Justice Ruth Bader Ginsburg, the Supreme Court unanimously nullified Skilling's honest services fraud conviction, finding that "Skilling's misconduct entailed no bribe or kickback". The Court remanded the Skilling case back to the lower court for further proceedings to decide which charges must now be dismissed as the result of the invalidation of the honest services statute.

In April 2011, a three-judge panel of the Fifth Circuit Court of Appeals ruled that since the jury was presented with "overwhelming evidence" that Skilling conspired to commit conspiracy fraud, the verdict would have been the same even if the honest services theory had never been presented, and Skilling's conviction was confirmed. The case in the Fifth Circuit is United States of America v. Jeffrey K. Skilling, 06-20885. Skilling appealed this new decision to the Supreme Court, but was denied certiorari. In 2013, Skilling's lawyers and the Justice Department reached a deal that called for Skilling's sentence to be reduced to 14 years. The reduction was driven in part by a 2009 appeals court ruling that ordered a recalculation of Skilling's sentence because of a mistake made by the judge in interpreting the federal sentencing guidelines. In exchange for his reduced sentence, Skilling gave up about $42 million, to be distributed to victims of Enron's fraud. He also agreed not to pursue any further legal appeals, including a claim that would have accused the prosecution team of misconduct. Federal judge Simeon T. Lake III, who had presided over Skilling's 2006 trial, accepted the deal on June 21, 2013. Skilling was released from federal custody on February 21, 2019, after 12 years in federal prison.

== Business ventures after Enron ==
In June 2020, Skilling was reported by Reuters to be fundraising for launch of an online oil and gas trading platform named Veld LLC. In August 2021, Veld LLC filed as a business in the State of Texas. According to the public records available through the Texas Comptroller of Public Accounts, Rebecca Carter, Skilling's wife, is listed as manager of the company. On August 30, 2022 the company became listed as withdrawn.

== Personal life ==
Skilling has a daughter and two sons from his first marriage to Susan Long, which ended in divorce in 1997. His youngest child, John Taylor "JT" Skilling, was found dead from a drug overdose at age 20 in his apartment in Santa Ana, California on February 3, 2011. Jeff Skilling was not allowed out of prison to attend his son's funeral.

In March 2002, Skilling married Rebecca Carter, a former vice president for board communications and board secretary at Enron.
