= Enron =

Defunct American energy company

Enron Corporation
- Logo (designed by Paul Rand) used from 1997 to 2001. This was Rand's final major logo before his death in November 1996.

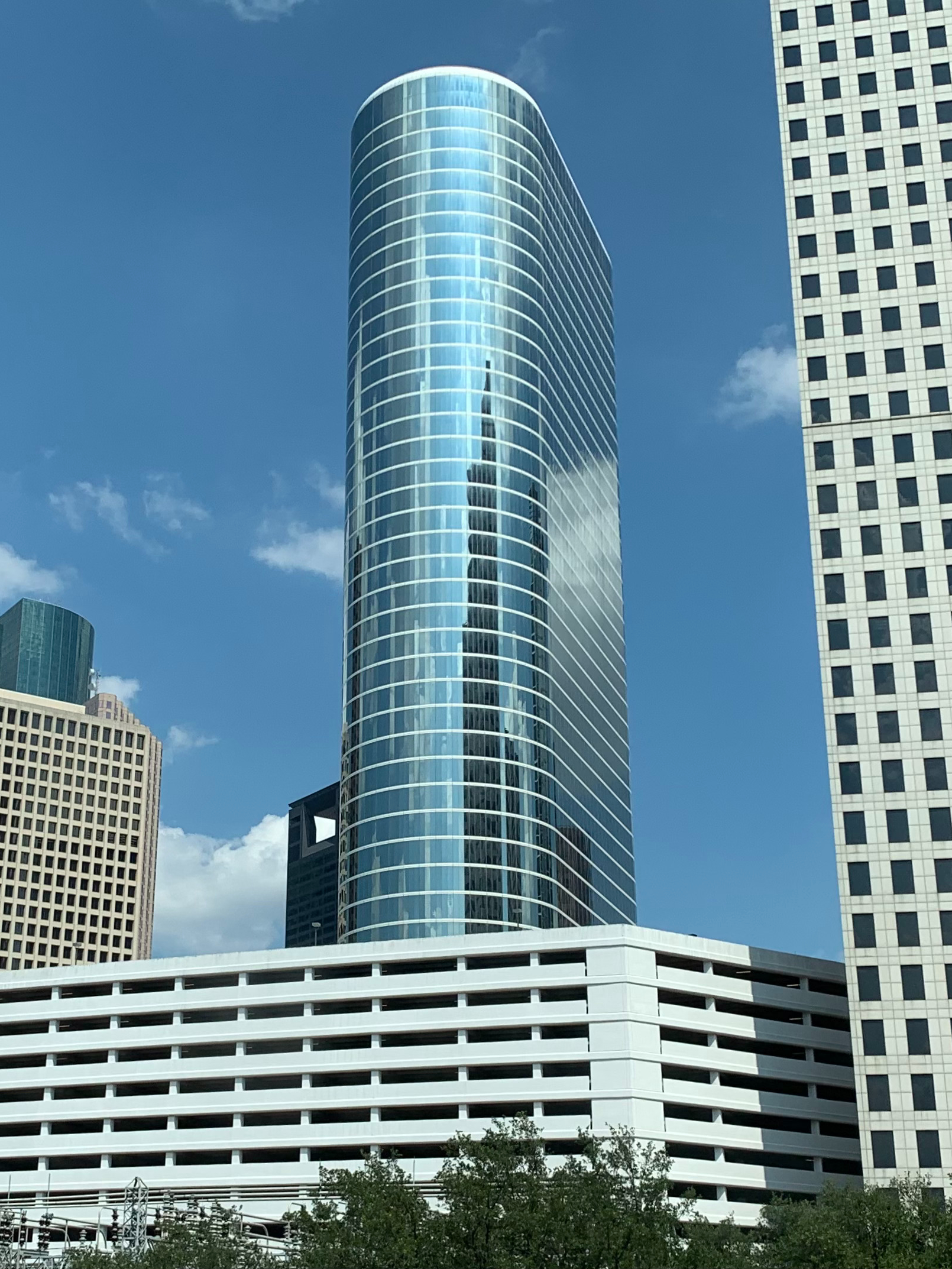
- 1400 Smith Street, the former headquarters of Enron in Houston, Texas. It is now occupied by Chevron Corporation.
- Type: Public
- Traded as: OTC Pink: ENRNQ; NYSE: ENE
- Industry: Energy
- Predecessor: InterNorth (Northern Natural Gas Company); Houston Natural Gas; merger in 1985
- Founded: July 16, 1985; 41 years ago in Omaha, Nebraska, U.S.
- Founder: Kenneth Lay (for the Houston National Gas branch)
- Defunct: March 1, 2007; 19 years ago November 28, 2016; 9 years ago (as Enron Creditors Recovery Corporation)
- Fate: Chapter 11 bankruptcy (as a result of accounting fraud)
- Successor: Dynegy; Prisma Energy International
- Headquarters: 1400 Smith Street; Houston, Texas, United States
- Area served: United States, India, Caribbean, Brazil, Canada, and Mexico
- Key people: Kenneth Lay (founder, chairman and CEO); Jeffrey Skilling (former president, COO, and CEO); Andrew Fastow (former CFO); Rebecca Mark-Jusbasche (former vice chairman, chairman and CEO of Enron International); Jason Paxton (director of finance)
- Services: Energy
- Revenue: $100.789 billion
- Net income: $979 million
- Total assets: $67.503 billion
- Number of employees: 20,600 (2000)
- Divisions: Enron Energy Services (EES); Enron Xcelerator
- Website: enron.com at the Wayback Machine (archived June 20, 2000)

Enron Corporation was an American energy, commodities and services company based in Houston, Texas. It was led by Kenneth Lay and developed in 1985 via a merger between Houston Natural Gas and InterNorth, both relatively small regional companies at the time of the merger. Before its bankruptcy on December 2, 2001, Enron employed approximately 20,600 staff and was a major electricity, natural gas, communications, and pulp and paper company, with claimed revenues of nearly $101 billion during 2000. Fortune named Enron "America's Most Innovative Company" for six consecutive years.

At the end of 2001, it was revealed that Enron's reported financial condition was sustained by an institutionalized, systematic, and creatively planned accounting fraud, known since as the Enron scandal. Enron became synonymous with willful, institutional fraud and systemic corruption. The scandal brought into question the accounting practices and activities of many corporations in the United States and was a factor in the enactment of the Sarbanes–Oxley Act of 2002. It affected the greater business world by causing, together with the even larger fraudulent bankruptcy of WorldCom, the dissolution of the Arthur Andersen accounting firm, which had been Enron and WorldCom's main auditor, and coconspirator in the fraud for years.

Enron filed for bankruptcy in the United States District Court for the Southern District of New York in late 2001 and selected Weil, Gotshal & Manges as its bankruptcy counsel. Enron emerged from bankruptcy in November 2004, under a court-approved plan of reorganization. A new board of directors changed its name to Enron Creditors Recovery Corp., and emphasized reorganizing and liquidating certain operations and assets of the pre-bankruptcy Enron. On September 7, 2006, Enron sold its last remaining subsidiary, Prisma Energy International, to Ashmore Energy International Ltd. (now AEI). It is the largest bankruptcy due specifically to fraud in United States history.

== History ==
=== Pre-merger origins (1925–1985) ===
==== InterNorth ====
One of Enron's primary predecessors was InterNorth, which was formed in 1930 as Northern Natural Gas Company, in Omaha, Nebraska, just a few months after Black Tuesday. The low cost of natural gas and the cheap supply of labor during the Great Depression helped to fuel the company's early beginnings, doubling in size by 1932. Over the next 50 years, Northern expanded even more as it acquired many energy companies. It was reorganized in 1979 as the main subsidiary of a holding company, InterNorth, a diversified energy and energy-related products firm. Although most of the acquisitions conducted were successful, some ended poorly. InterNorth competed with Cooper Industries unsuccessfully over a hostile takeover of Crouse-Hinds Company, an electrical products manufacturer. Cooper and InterNorth feuded in numerous suits during the takeover that were eventually settled after the transaction was completed. The subsidiary Northern Natural Gas operated the largest pipeline company in North America. By the 1980s, InterNorth became a major force for natural gas production, transmission, and marketing as well as for natural gas liquids, and was an innovator in the plastics industry. In 1983, InterNorth merged with the Belco Petroleum Company, a Fortune 500 oil exploration and development company founded by Arthur Belfer.

==== Houston Natural Gas ====
The Houston Natural Gas (HNG) corporation was initially formed from the Houston Oil Co. in 1925 to provide gas to customers in the Houston market through the building of gas pipelines. Under the leadership of CEO Robert Herring from 1967 to 1981, the company took advantage of the unregulated Texas natural gas market and the commodity surge in the early 1970s to become a dominant force in the energy industry. Toward the end of the 1970s, HNG's luck began to run out with rising gas prices forcing clients to switch to oil. In addition, with the passing of the Natural Gas Policy Act of 1978, the Texas market was less profitable and as a result, HNG's profits fell. After Herring died in 1981, M.D. Matthews briefly took over as CEO in a 3-year stint with initial success, but ultimately, a big dip in earnings led to his exit. In 1984, Kenneth Lay succeeded Matthews and inherited the troubled conglomerate.

==== Merger ====
With its conservative success, InterNorth became a target of corporate takeovers, the most prominent originating with Irwin Jacobs. InterNorth CEO Sam Segnar sought a friendly merger with HNG. In May 1985, Internorth acquired HNG for $2.3 billion, 40% higher than the current market price, and on July 16, 1985, the two entities voted to merge. The combined assets of the two companies created the second largest gas pipeline system in the US at that time. Internorth's north–south pipelines that served Iowa and Minnesota complemented HNG's Florida and California east-west pipelines well.

=== Post-merger rise (1985–1991) ===
Enron's initial logo after its 1986 launch

The company was initially named HNG/InterNorth Inc., even though InterNorth was technically the parent. At the outset, Segnar was CEO, but was soon fired by the board of directors to name Lay to the post. Lay moved its headquarters back to Houston and set out to find a new name, spending more than $100,000 in focus groups and consultants in the process. Lippincott & Margulies, the advertising firm responsible for the InterNorth identity five years prior, suggested "Enteron". During a meeting with employees on February 14, 1986, Lay announced his interest in this name change, which would be held to a stockholder vote on April 10. Less than a month from this meeting, on March 7, 1986, a spokesman for HNG/InterNorth rescinded the planned Enteron proposal, as since its announcement the name had come under scrutiny for being the same as a medical term for the intestines. This same press release saw the introduction of the Enron name, which would be the new name voted on come April.

Some problems lingered after the merger, however; Enron still had to pay Jacobs, an ongoing threat, over $350 million, and it needed to reorganize the company. Lay sold off any parts of the company that he believed didn't belong in the long-term future of Enron. Lay consolidated all the gas pipeline efforts under the Enron Gas Pipeline Operating Company. In addition, it ramped up its electric power and natural gas efforts. In 1988 and 1989, the company added power plants and cogeneration units to its portfolio. In 1989, Jeffrey Skilling, then a consultant at McKinsey & Company, came up with the idea to link natural gas to consumers in more ways, effectively turning natural gas into a commodity. Enron adopted the idea and called it the "Gas Bank". The division's success prompted Skilling to join Enron as the head of the Gas Bank in 1991. Another major development inside Enron was a pivot to overseas operations with a $56 million loan in 1989 from the Overseas Private Investment Corporation (OPIC) for a power plant in Argentina.

==== Timeline (1985–1992) ====
===== 1980s =====
- New regulations gradually create a market-pricing system for natural gas. Federal Energy Regulatory Commission (FERC) Order 436 (1985) provides blanket approval for pipelines that choose to become common carriers transporting gas intrastate. FERC Order 451 (1986) deregulates the wellhead, and FERC Order 490 (April 1988) authorizes producers, pipelines, and others to terminate gas sales or purchases without seeking prior FERC approval. As a result of these orders, more than 75% of gas sales are conducted through the spot market, and unprecedented market volatility exists.

====== July 1985 ======
- Houston Natural Gas, run by Kenneth Lay, merges with InterNorth, a natural gas company in Omaha, Nebraska, to form an interstate and intrastate natural gas pipeline with approximately 37,000 mi (60,000 km) of pipeline.

====== November 1985 ======
- Lay is appointed chairman and chief executive of the combined company. The company chooses the name Enron.

===== 1986 =====
- Company moves headquarters to Houston, where Ken Lay lives. Enron is both a natural gas and oil company.
- Enron's vision: To become the premier natural gas pipeline in America.

===== 1987 =====
- Enron Oil, Enron's petroleum marketing operation, reports a loss of $85 million in 8-K filings. True loss of $142–190 million is concealed until 1993. Two top Enron Oil executives in Valhalla, New York, plead guilty to charges of fraud and filing false tax returns. One serves time in prison.

===== 1988 =====
- The company's major strategy shift – to pursue unregulated markets in addition to its regulated pipeline business – is decided in a gathering that became known as the Come to Jesus meeting.
- Enron enters the UK energy market following the privatization of the electricity industry there. It becomes the first U.S. company to construct a power plant, Teesside Power Station, in Great Britain.

===== 1989 =====
- Enron launches Gas Bank, later run by CEO Jeff Skilling in 1990, which allows gas producers and wholesale buyers to purchase gas supplies and hedge the price risk at the same time.
- Enron begins offering financing to oil and gas producers.
- Transwestern Pipeline Company, owned by Enron at that time, is the first merchant pipeline in the US to stop selling gas and become a transportation-only pipeline.

===== 1990 =====
- Enron launches plan to expand US natural gas business abroad.
- Enron becomes a natural gas market maker. Begins trading futures and options on the New York Mercantile Exchange and over-the-counter market using financial instruments such as swaps and options.
- Ken Lay and Rich Kinder hire Jeff Skilling from McKinsey & Company to become CEO of Enron Gas Services, Enron's "Gas Bank". Enron Gas Services eventually morphs into Enron Capital and Trade Resources (ECT).
- Jeff Skilling hires Andrew Fastow from the banking industry; he starts as account director and quickly rises within the ranks of ECT.

===== 1991 =====
- Enron adopts mark-to-market accounting practices, reporting income and value of assets at their replacement cost.
- Rebecca Mark becomes chairman and CEO of Enron Development Corp., a unit formed to pursue international markets.
- Andy Fastow forms the first of many off-balance-sheet partnerships for legitimate purposes. Later, off-balance-sheet partnerships and transactions will become a way for money-losing ventures to be concealed and income reporting to be accelerated. (Note: In September 1999, Fastow pitched a partnership between Enron and Merrill Lynch to provide $390 million in outside investments for the Fastow controlled private partnership known as the LJM2 Co-Investment LP. The then Enron Treasurer Jeff McMahon would book a $12 million gain and meet its earnings target for 1999 with a $7 million investment from Merrill Lynch for a stake in three floating power generators off Nigeria. In July 2000, Merrill Lynch sold its stake in three floating power generators off Nigeria to the Fastow-controlled LJM2 to place the venture off the books. In August 2001, Sherron Watkins informed Ken Lay that the Fastow partnerships could cause Enron to "implode in a wave of accounting scandals." Lay requested that Watkins and Elizabeth A. Tilney, whose investment banker husband Schuyler Tilney is a managing director and head of the energy investment banking unit at Merill Lynch and a close personal friend of Andrew S. Fastow and his wife Lea, develop a crisis management strategy. In 1993, Schuyler Tilney joined Merrill Lynch and previously he had been employed at CS First Boston during which CS First Boston invested heavily in the privatization of Russia.)

===== 1992 =====
- Enron acquires Transportadora de Gas del Sur.

=== 1991–2000 ===
Throughout the 1990s, Enron made a few changes to its business plan that greatly improved the perceived profitability of the company. First, Enron invested heavily in overseas assets, specifically energy. Another major shift was the gradual transition of focus from a producer of energy to a company that acted more like an investment firm and sometimes a hedge fund, making profits off the margins of the products it traded. These products were traded through the Gas Bank concept, now called the Enron Finance Corp. and headed by Skilling.

==== Operations as a trading firm ====
With the success of the Gas Bank trading natural gas, Skilling looked to expand the horizons of his division, Enron Capital & Trade. Skilling hired Andrew Fastow in 1990 to help.

==== Entrance into the retail energy market ====
Starting in 1994 under the Energy Policy Act of 1992, Congress allowed states to deregulate their electricity utilities, allowing them to be opened for competition. California was one such state to do so. Enron, seeing an opportunity with rising prices, was eager to jump into the market. In 1997, Enron acquired Portland General Electric (PGE). Although an Oregon utility, it had the potential to begin serving the massive California market since PGE was a regulated utility. The new Enron division, Enron Energy, ramped up its efforts by offering discounts to potential customers in California starting in 1998. Enron Energy also began to sell natural gas to customers in Ohio and wind power in Iowa. However, the company ended its retail endeavor in 1999 as it was revealed it was costing upwards of $100 million a year.

==== Data management ====
As fiber optic technology progressed in the 1990s, multiple companies, including Enron, attempted to make money by "keeping the continuing network costs low", which was done by owning their own network. In 1997, FTV Communications LLC, a limited liability company formed by Enron subsidiary FirstPoint Communications, Inc., constructed a 1,380 miles (2,220 km) fiber optic network between Portland and Las Vegas. In 1998, Enron constructed a building in a rundown area of Las Vegas near E Sahara, right over the "backbone" of fiber optic cables providing service to technology companies nationwide. The location had the ability to send "the entire Library of Congress anywhere in the world within minutes" and could stream "video to the whole state of California". The location was also more protected from natural disasters than areas such as Los Angeles or the East Coast. According to Wall Street Daily, "Enron had a secret", it "wanted to trade bandwidth like it traded oil, gas, electricity, etc. It launched a secret plan to build an enormous amount of fiber optic transmission capacity in Las Vegas ... it was all part of Enron's plan to essentially own the internet." Enron sought to have all US internet service providers rely on their Nevada facility to supply bandwidth, which Enron would sell in a fashion similar to other commodities.

In January 2000, Kenneth Lay and Jeffrey Skilling announced to analysts that they were going to open trading for their own "high-speed fiber-optic networks that form the backbone for Internet traffic". Investors quickly bought Enron stock following the announcement "as they did with most things Internet-related at the time", with stock prices rising from $40 per share in January 2000 to $70 per share in March, peaking at $90 in the summer of 2000. Enron executives obtained windfall gains from the rising stock prices, with a total of $924 million of stocks sold by high-level Enron employees between 2000 and 2001. The head of Enron Broadband Services, Kenneth Rice, sold 1 million shares himself, earning about $70 million in returns. As prices of existing fiber optic cables plummeted due to the vast oversupply of the system, with only 5% of the 40 million miles being active wires, Enron purchased the inactive "dark fibers", expecting to buy them at low cost and then make a profit as the need for more usage by internet providers increased, with Enron expecting to lease its acquired dark fibers in 20-year contracts to providers. However, Enron's accounting would use estimates to determine how much their dark fiber would be worth when "lit" and apply those estimates to their current income, adding exaggerated revenue to their accounts since transactions were not yet made and it was not known if the cables would ever be active. Enron's trading with other energy companies within the broadband market was its attempt to lure large telecommunications companies, such as Verizon Communications, into its broadband scheme to create its own new market.

By the second quarter of 2001, Enron Broadband Services was reporting losses. On March 12, 2001, a proposed 20-year deal between Enron and Blockbuster Inc. to stream movies on demand over Enron's connections was canceled, with Enron shares dropping from $80 per share in mid-February 2001 to below $60 the week after the deal was killed. The branch of the company that Jeffrey Skilling "said would eventually add $40 billion to Enron's stock value" added only about $408 million in revenue for Enron in 2001, with the company's broadband arm closed shortly after its meager second-quarter earnings report in July 2001.

Following the bankruptcy of Enron, telecommunications holdings were sold for "pennies on the dollar". In 2002, Rob Roy of Switch Communications purchased Enron's Nevada facility in an auction attended only by Roy. Enron's "fiber plans were so secretive that few people even knew about the auction." The facility was sold for only $930,000. Following the sale, Switch expanded to control "the biggest data center in the world".

==== Overseas expansion ====
Enron, seeing stability after the merger, began to look overseas for new possible energy opportunities in 1991. Enron's first such opportunity was a natural gas power plant utilizing cogeneration that the company built near Middlesbrough, UK. The power plant was so large it could produce up to 3% of the United Kingdom's electricity demand with a capacity of over 1,875 megawatts. Seeing the success in England, the company developed and diversified its assets worldwide under the name of Enron International (EI), headed by former HNG executive Rebecca Mark. By 1994, EI's portfolio included assets in The Philippines, Australia, Guatemala, Germany, France, India, Argentina, the Caribbean, China, England, Colombia, Turkey, Bolivia, Brazil, Indonesia, Norway, Poland, and Japan. The division was producing a large share of earnings for Enron, contributing 25% of earnings in 1996. Mark and EI believed the water industry was the next market to be deregulated by authorities. Seeing the potential, they searched for ways to enter the market, similar to PGE.

During this period of growth, Enron introduced a new corporate identity on January 14, 1997, and from that point adopted their distinctive tricolor E logo. This logo was one of the final projects of legendary graphic designer Paul Rand before his death in 1996, and debuted almost three months after his departure.

In 1998, Enron International acquired Wessex Water for $2.88 billion. Wessex Water became the core asset of a new company, Azurix, which expanded to other water companies. After Azurix's promising IPO in June 1999, Enron "sucked out over $1 billion in cash while loading it up with debt", according to Bethany McLean and Peter Elkind, authors of The Smartest Guys in the Room: The Amazing Rise and Scandalous Fall of Enron. Additionally, British water regulators required Wessex to cut its rates by 12% starting in April 2000, and an upgrade was required of the utility's aging infrastructure, estimated at costing over a billion dollars. By the end of 2000 Azurix had an operating profit of less than $100 million and was $2 billion in debt. In August 2000, after Azurix stock took a plunge following its earnings report, Mark resigned from Azurix and Enron. Azurix assets, including Wessex, were eventually sold by Enron.

=== Misleading financial accounts ===
In 1990, Enron's chief operating officer Jeffrey Skilling hired Andrew Fastow, who was well acquainted with the burgeoning deregulated energy market that Skilling wanted to exploit. In 1993, Fastow began establishing numerous limited liability special-purpose entities, a common business practice in the energy industry. However, it also allowed Enron to transfer some of its liabilities off its books, allowing it to maintain a robust and generally increasing stock price and thus keep its critical investment-grade credit ratings.

Enron was named "America's Most Innovative Company" by Fortune for six consecutive years, from 1996 to 2001. It was on the Fortune's "100 Best Companies to Work for in America" list during 2000, and had offices that were stunning in their opulence. Enron was hailed by many, including labor and the workforce, as an overall great company, praised for its large long-term pensions, benefits for its workers, and extremely effective management until the exposure of its corporate fraud.

The first analyst to question the company's success story was Daniel Scotto, an energy market expert at BNP Paribas, who issued a note in August 2001 entitled Enron: All stressed up and no place to go which encouraged investors to sell Enron stocks, although he only changed his recommendation on the stock from "buy" to "neutral".

As was later discovered, many of Enron's recorded assets and profits were inflated, wholly fraudulent, or nonexistent. One example was in 1999 when Enron promised to repay Merrill Lynch's investment with interest to show a profit on its books. Debts and losses were put into entities formed offshore that were not included in the company's financial statements; other sophisticated and arcane financial transactions between Enron and related companies were used to eliminate unprofitable entities from the company's books.

The company's most valuable asset and the largest source of stable income, the 1930s-era Northern Natural Gas company, was eventually purchased by a group of Omaha investors who relocated its headquarters to their city; it is now a unit of Warren Buffett's Berkshire Hathaway Energy. NNG was established as collateral for a $2.5 billion capital infusion by Dynegy Corporation when Dynegy was planning to buy Enron. When Dynegy examined Enron's financial records carefully, they repudiated the deal and dismissed their CEO, Chuck Watson. The new chairman and CEO, the late Daniel Dienstbier, had been president of NNG and an Enron executive at one time and was forced out by Ken Lay. Dienstbier was an acquaintance of Warren Buffett. NNG continues to be profitable now.

=== 2002–2006 ===
- In 2003, Enron moved its subsidiaries of Transwestern Pipeline, Citrus Corporation, and Northern Plains Natural Gas Company into a separate corporation. The plan was to distribute the shares of the new pipeline company to creditors as part of the planned reorganization. Enron later announced the name of the new pipeline corporation as CrossCountry Energy (CCE).
- As a result of an attempted merger with Dynegy and a series of court cases between Enron and Dynegy, Northern Plains became a part of Dynegy as a settlement from Enron. MidAmerican Energy Holdings, a subsidiary of Berkshire Hathaway, later purchased the pipeline company from Dynegy for $928 million.
- In 2004, CCE was in turn purchased by CCE Holdings Inc. (CCEH), a joint venture between Southern Union Co. and GE Commercial Finance Energy Financial Service. Citrus Corporation, which owns 100% of Florida Gas Transmission Corporation, was 50% owned by CCE and a subsidiary of El Paso Natural Gas Company. CCEH acquired 50% of Citrus Corporation as purchased CCE. CCEH was the successful bidder in the U.S. Bankruptcy Court for the Southern District of New York auction of CCE.
- In 2006, 50% of CCEH was purchased by Energy Transfer Partners (ETP). CCEH later redeemed ETP's 50% ownership into 100% ownership of Transwestern.

== 2001 accounting scandals ==
In 2001, after a series of revelations involving irregular accounting procedures perpetrated throughout the 1990s involving Enron and its auditor Arthur Andersen that bordered on fraud, Enron filed for the then largest Chapter 11 bankruptcy in history (since surpassed by those of Worldcom during 2002 and Lehman Brothers during 2008), resulting in $11 billion in shareholder losses.

Stock Price of Enron from August 2000 to January 2002

As the scandal progressed, Enron's share price decreased from US$90 during the summer of 2000, to just pennies. Enron's demise occurred after the revelation that much of its profit and revenue were the result of deals with special-purpose entities (limited partnerships, which it controlled). This maneuver allowed many of Enron's debts and losses to disappear from its financial statements.

Enron filed for bankruptcy on December 2, 2001. In addition, the scandal caused the dissolution of Arthur Andersen, which at the time was one of the Big Five of the world's accounting firms. The company was found guilty of obstruction of justice in 2002 for destroying documents related to the Enron audit. Since the SEC is not allowed to accept audits from convicted felons, Andersen was forced to stop auditing public companies. Although the conviction was dismissed in 2005 by the Supreme Court, the damage to the Andersen name has prevented it from recovering or reviving itself as a viable business even on a limited scale.

Enron also withdrew a naming-rights deal with the Houston Astros Major League Baseball club for its new stadium, which was known formerly as Enron Field (now Daikin Park).

=== Accounting practices ===
Enron used a variety of deceptive and fraudulent tactics and accounting practices to cover its fraud in reporting its financial information. Special-purpose entities were created to mask significant liabilities from Enron's financial statements. These entities made Enron seem more profitable than it was, and created a dangerous spiral in which, each quarter, corporate officers would have to perform more and more financial deception to create the illusion of billions of dollars in profit while the company was actually losing money. This practice increased their stock price to new levels, at which point the executives began to work on insider information and trade millions of dollars' worth of Enron stock. The executives and insiders at Enron knew about the offshore accounts that were hiding losses for the company; the investors, however, did not. Chief Financial Officer Andrew Fastow directed the team that created the off-books companies and manipulated the deals to provide himself, his family, and his friends with hundreds of millions of dollars in guaranteed revenue, at the expense of the corporation for which he worked and its stockholders.

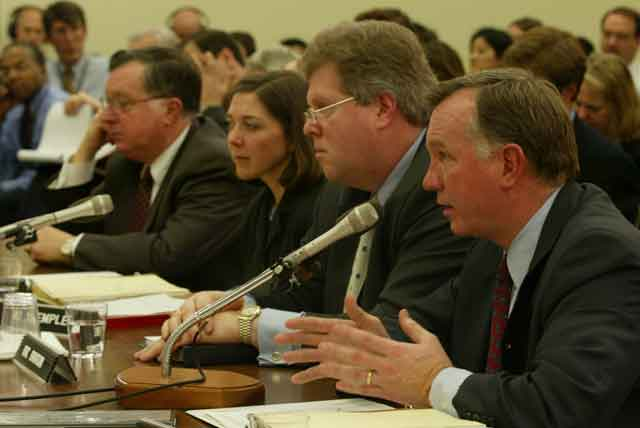
Arthur Andersen employees, from left, Michael C. Odom, Nancy Temple, Dorsey Baskin Jr., and C.E. Andrews are sworn in as they appear before a House Committee on January 24, 2002.

In 1999, Enron initiated EnronOnline, an Internet-based trading operation, which was used by virtually every energy company in the United States. By promoting the company's aggressive investment strategy, Enron's president and chief operating officer Jeffrey Skilling helped make Enron the biggest wholesaler of gas and electricity, trading over $27 billion per quarter. The corporation's financial claims, however, had to be accepted at face value. Under Skilling, Enron adopted mark-to-market accounting, in which anticipated future profits from any deal were tabulated as if currently real. Thus, Enron could record gains from what over time might turn out to be losses, as the company's fiscal health became secondary to manipulating its stock price during the so-called Tech boom. However, when a company's success is measured by undocumented financial statements, actual balance sheets are inconvenient. Indeed, Enron's unscrupulous actions were often gambles to keep the deception going and so increase the stock price. An advancing price meant a continued infusion of investor capital on which debt-ridden Enron in large part subsisted (much like a financial "pyramid" or "Ponzi scheme"). Attempting to maintain the illusion, Skilling verbally attacked Wall Street analyst Richard Grubman, who questioned Enron's unusual accounting practice during a recorded conference telephone call. When Grubman complained that Enron was the only company that could not release a balance sheet along with its earnings statements, Skilling replied, "Well, thank you very much, we appreciate that ... asshole." Though the comment was met with dismay and astonishment by press, Wall Street analysts and public, it became an inside joke among many Enron employees, mocking Grubman for his perceived meddling rather than Skilling's offensiveness.

=== Post-bankruptcy ===
Enron initially planned to retain its three domestic pipeline companies as well as most of its overseas assets. However, before emerging from bankruptcy, Enron sold its domestic pipeline companies as CrossCountry Energy for $2.45 billion and later sold other assets to Vulcan Capital Management.

Enron sold its last business, Prisma Energy, during 2006, leaving Enron asset-less. During early 2007, its name was changed to Enron Creditors Recovery Corporation. Its goal was to repay the old Enron's remaining creditors and end Enron's affairs. In December 2008, it was announced that Enron's creditors would receive $7.2 billion from the company's liquidation (approximately 17 percent of the debts owed by the company). After Citigroup and JP Morgan Chase were sued for their role in abetting Enron's practices with loans, the two companies agreed to give billions of dollars to Enron's creditors. By May 2011, $21.8 billion had been distributed to the creditors, totaling 53 percent of Enron's debts at the time of bankruptcy. Enron Creditors Recovery Corporation was ultimately dissolved on November 28, 2016.

Azurix, the former water utility part of the company, remains under Enron ownership, although it is currently asset-less. It is involved in several litigations against the government of Argentina claiming compensation relating to the negligence and corruption of the local governance during its management of the Buenos Aires water concession in 1999, which resulted in substantial amounts of debt (approx. $620 million) and the eventual collapse of the branch.

Soon after emerging from bankruptcy in November 2004, Enron's new board of directors sued 11 financial institutions for helping Lay, Fastow, Skilling, and others hide Enron's true financial condition. The proceedings were dubbed the "megaclaims litigation". Among the defendants were Royal Bank of Scotland, Deutsche Bank and Citigroup. As of 2008, Enron has settled with all of the institutions, ending with Citigroup. Enron was able to obtain nearly $7.2 billion to distribute to its creditors as a result of the megaclaims litigation. As of December 2009, some claim and process payments were still being distributed.

== Insider trading scandal ==
=== Peak and decline of stock price ===
In August 2000, Enron's stock price attained its greatest value, closing at $90 on the 23rd. At this time, Enron executives, who possessed inside information on the hidden losses, began to sell their stock. At the same time, the general public and Enron's investors were told to buy the stock. Executives told the investors that the stock would continue to increase until it attained possibly the $130 to $140 range, while secretly unloading their shares.

As executives sold their shares, the price began to decrease. Investors were told to continue buying stock or hold steady if they already owned Enron because the stock price would rebound shortly. Kenneth Lay's strategy for responding to Enron's continuing problems was his demeanor. As he did many times, Lay would issue a statement or make an appearance to calm investors and assure them that Enron was doing well. In March 2001 an article by Bethany McLean appeared in Fortune magazine noting that no one understood how the company made money and questioning whether Enron stock was overvalued.

By August 15, 2001, Enron's stock price had decreased to $42. Many of the investors still trusted Lay and believed that Enron would rule the market. They continued to buy or retain their stock as the equity value decreased. As October ended, the stock had decreased to $15. Many considered this a great opportunity to buy Enron stock because of what Lay had been telling them in the media.

Lay was accused of selling more than $70 million worth of stock at this time, which he used to repay cash advances on lines of credit. He sold another $29 million worth of stock in the open market. Also, Lay's wife, Linda, was accused of selling 500,000 shares of Enron stock totaling $1.2 million on November 28, 2001. The money earned from this sale did not go to the family but rather to charitable organizations, which had already received pledges of contributions from the foundation. Records show that Mrs. Lay made the sale order sometime between 10:00 and 10:20 am. News of Enron's problems, including the millions of dollars in losses they hid, became public about 10:30 that morning, and the stock price soon decreased to less than one dollar.

Former Enron executive Paula Rieker was charged with criminal insider trading and sentenced to two years' probation. Rieker obtained 18,380 Enron shares for $15.51 a share. She sold that stock for $49.77 a share in July 2001, a week before the public was told what she already knew about the $102 million loss. In 2002, after the tumultuous fall of Enron's external auditor, and management consultant, Andersen LLP, former Andersen Director, John M. Cunningham coined the phrase, "We have all been Enroned."

The fallout resulted in both Lay and Skilling being convicted of conspiracy, fraud, and insider trading. Lay died before sentencing, Skilling got 24 years and 4 months and a $45 million penalty (later reduced). Fastow was sentenced to six years of jail time, and Lou Pai settled out of court for $31.5 million.

== California's deregulation and subsequent energy crisis ==
In October 2000, Daniel Scotto, the most renowned utility analyst on Wall Street, suspended his ratings on all energy companies conducting business in California because of the possibility that the companies would not receive full and adequate compensation for the deferred energy accounts used as the basis for the California Deregulation Plan enacted during the late 1990s. Five months later, Pacific Gas & Electric (PG&E) was forced into bankruptcy. Republican Senator Phil Gramm, husband of Enron Board member Wendy Gramm and also the second-largest recipient of campaign contributions from Enron, succeeded in legislating California's energy commodity trading deregulation. Despite warnings from prominent consumer groups which stated that this law would give energy traders too much influence over energy commodity prices, the legislation was passed in December 2000.

As the periodical Public Citizen reported:

Because of Enron's new, unregulated power auction, the company's "Wholesale Services'' revenues quadrupled – from $12 billion in the first quarter of 2000 to $48.4 billion in the first quarter of 2001.

After the passage of the deregulation law, California had a total of 38 Stage 3 rolling blackouts declared, until federal regulators intervened in June 2001. These blackouts occurred as a result of a poorly designed market system that was manipulated by traders and marketers, as well as from poor state management and regulatory oversight. Subsequently, Enron traders were revealed as intentionally encouraging the removal of power from the market during California's energy crisis by encouraging suppliers to shut down plants to perform unnecessary maintenance, as documented in recordings made at the time. These acts contributed to the need for rolling blackouts, which adversely affected many businesses dependent upon a reliable supply of electricity, and inconvenienced a large number of retail customers. This scattered supply increased the price, and Enron traders were thus able to sell power at premium prices, sometimes up to a factor of 20 times its normal peak value.

The callousness of the traders' attitude toward ratepayers was documented in an evidence tape of a conversation regarding the matter, and sarcastically referencing the confusion of retiree voters in Florida's Miami-Dade County in the November 2000, presidential election.

"They're fucking taking all the money back from you guys? All the money you guys stole from those poor grandmothers in California?"

"Yeah, Grandma Millie man. But she's the one who couldn't figure out how to fucking vote on the butterfly ballot." (Laughing from both sides.)

"Yeah, now she wants her fucking money back for all the power you've charged right up, jammed right up her ass for fucking $250 a megawatt-hour."

The traders had been discussing the efforts of the Snohomish PUD in Northwestern Washington state to recover the massive overcharges that Enron had engineered. Morgan Stanley, which had taken Enron's place in the lawsuit, fought the release of the documents that the PUD had sought to make its case, but were being withheld by the Federal Energy Regulatory Commission.

== Former management and corporate governance ==
Corporate leadership and central management
- Kenneth Lay: chairman, and chief executive officer
- Jeffrey Skilling: president, chief operating officer, and CEO (February–August 2001)
- Andrew Fastow: chief financial officer
- Richard Causey: chief accounting officer
- Rebecca Mark-Jusbasche: CEO of Enron International and Azurix
- Lou Pai: CEO of Enron Energy Services
- Forrest Hoglund: CEO of Enron Oil and Gas
- Dennis Ulak: president of Enron Oil and Gas International
- Jeffrey Sherrick: president of Enron Global Exploration & Production Inc.
- Richard Gallagher: head of Enron Wholesale Global International Group
- Kenneth "Ken" Rice: CEO of Enron Wholesale and Enron Broadband Services
- J. Clifford Baxter: CEO of Enron North America
- Sherron Watkins: head of Enron Global Finance
- Jim Derrick: Enron general counsel
- Mark Koenig: head of Enron Investor Relations
- Joan Foley: head of Enron Human Resources
- Richard Kinder: president and COO of Enron (1990 – December 1996)
- Greg Whalley: president and COO of Enron (August 2001–bankruptcy)
- Jeff McMahon: CFO of Enron (October 2001-bankruptcy)

Board of Directors of Enron Corporation
- Kenneth Lay: chairman of the board
- Robert A. Belfer
- Norman P. Blake Jr.
- Ronnie C. Chan
- John H. Duncan
- Wendy L. Gramm
- Ken L. Harrison
- Robert K. Jaedicke
- Charles A. LeMaistre
- John Mendelsohn
- Jerome J. Meyer
- Richard K. Gallagher
- Paulo V. Ferraz Pereira
- Frank Savage:
- John A. Urquhart
- John Wakeham
- Herbert S. Winokur Jr.

== Products ==
Enron traded in more than 30 different products, including oil and LNG transportation, broadband, principal investments, risk management for commodities, shipping / freight, streaming media, and water and wastewater. Products traded on EnronOnline in particular included petrochemicals, plastics, power, pulp and paper, steel, and weather risk management. Enron was also an extensive futures trader, including sugar, coffee, grains, hogs, and other meat futures. At the time of its bankruptcy filing in December 2001, Enron was structured into seven distinct business units.

=== Online marketplace services ===
- EnronOnline (commodity trading platform).
- ClickPaper (transaction platform for pulp, paper, and wood products).
- EnronCredit (the first global online credit department to provide live credit prices and enable business-to-business customers to hedge credit exposure instantly via the Internet).
- ePowerOnline (customer interface for Enron Broadband Services).
- Enron Direct (sales of fixed-price contracts for gas and electricity; Europe only).
- EnergyDesk (energy-related derivatives trading; Europe only).
- NewPowerCompany (online energy trading, joint venture with IBM and AOL).
- Enron Weather (weather derivatives).
- DealBench (online business services).
- Water2Water (water storage, supply, and quality credits trading).
- HotTap (customer interface for Enron's U.S. gas pipeline businesses).
- Enromarkt (business-to-business pricing and information platform; Germany only).

=== Broadband services ===
- Enron Intelligent Network (broadband content delivery).
- Enron Media Services (risk management services for media content companies).
- Customizable Bandwidth Solutions (bandwidth and fiber products trading).
- Streaming Media Applications (live or on-demand Internet broadcasting applications).

=== Energy and commodities services ===
- Enron Power (electricity wholesaling).
- Enron Natural Gas (natural gas wholesaling).
- Enron Clean Fuels (biofuel wholesaling).
- Enron Pulp and Paper, Packaging, and Lumber (risk management derivatives for the forest products industry).
- Enron Coal and Emissions (coal wholesaling and CO_{2} offsets trading).
- Enron Plastics and Petrochemicals (price risk management for polymers, olefins, methanol, aromatics, and natural gas liquids).
- Enron Weather Risk Management (Weather Derivatives).
- Enron Steel (financial swap contracts and spot pricing for the steel industry).
- Enron Crude Oil and Oil Products (petroleum hedging).
- Enron Wind Power Services (wind turbine manufacturing and wind farm operation).
- MG Plc. (U.K. metals merchant).
- Enron Energy Services (Selling services to industrial end users).
- Enron International (operation of all overseas assets).

=== Capital and risk management services ===
==== Commercial and industrial outsourcing services ====
- Commodity Management.
- Energy Asset Management.
- Energy Information Management.
- Facility Management.
- Capital Management.
- Azurix Inc. (water utilities and infrastructure).

==== Project development and management services ====
- Energy Infrastructure Development (developing, financing, and operation of power plants and related projects).
- Enron Global Exploration & Production Inc. (upstream oil and natural gas international development).
- Elektro Electricidade e Servicos SA (Brazilian electric utility).
- Northern Border Pipeline.
- Houston Pipeline.
- Transwestern Pipeline.
- Florida Gas Transmission.
- Northern Natural Gas Company.
- Natural Gas Storage.
- Compression Services.
- Gas Processing and Treatment.
- Engineering, Procurement, and Construction Services.
- EOTT Energy Inc. (oil transportation).

Enron manufactured gas valves, circuit breakers, thermostats, and electrical equipment in Venezuela using INSELA SA, a 50–50 joint venture with General Electric. Enron owned three paper and pulp products companies: Garden State Paper, a newsprint mill; as well as Papiers Stadacona and St. Aurelie Timberlands. Enron had a controlling stake in the Louisiana-based petroleum exploration and production company Mariner Energy.

=== EnronOnline ===
Enron opened EnronOnline, an electronic trading platform for energy commodities, on November 29, 1999. Conceptualized by the company's European Gas Trading team, it was the first web-based transaction system that allowed buyers and sellers to buy, sell, and trade commodity products globally. It allowed users to do business only with Enron. The site allowed Enron to transact with participants in the global energy markets. The main commodities offered on EnronOnline were natural gas and electricity, although there were 500 other products including credit derivatives, bankruptcy swaps, pulp, gas, plastics, paper, steel, metals, freight, and TV commercial time. At its maximum, more than $6 billion worth of commodities were transacted using EnronOnline every day, but specialists questioned how Enron reported trades and calculated its profits, saying that the same fraudulent accounting that was rampant at Enron's other operations may have been used in trading.

After Enron's bankruptcy in late 2001, EnronOnline was sold to the Swiss financial giant UBS. Within a year, UBS abandoned its efforts to relaunch the division and closed it in November 2002.

=== Enron International ===
Enron International (EI) was Enron's wholesale asset development and asset management business. Its primary emphasis was developing and building natural gas power plants outside North America. Enron Engineering and Construction Company (EECC) was a wholly owned subsidiary of Enron International and built almost all of Enron International's power plants. Unlike other business units of Enron, Enron International had a strong cash flow at the bankruptcy filing. Enron International consisted of all of Enron's foreign power projects, including ones in Europe.

The company's Teesside plant was one of the largest gas-fired power stations in the world, built and operated by Enron from 1989, and produced 3 percent of the United Kingdom's energy needs. Enron owned half of the plant's equity, with the remaining 50 percent split between four regional electricity companies.

==== Management ====
Rebecca Mark was the CEO of Enron International until she resigned to manage Enron's newly acquired water business, Azurix, in 1997. Mark had a major role in the development of the Dabhol project in India, Enron's largest international endeavor.

==== Projects ====
Enron International constructed power plants and pipelines across the globe. Some are presently still operating, including the massive Teesside plant in England. Others, like a barge-mounted plant off Puerto Plata in the Dominican Republic, cost Enron money through lawsuits and investment losses. Puerto Plata was a barge-mounted power plant next to the hotel Hotelero del Atlantico. When the plant was activated, winds blew soot from the plant onto the hotel guests' meals, blackening their food. The winds also blew garbage from nearby slums into the plant's water-intake system. For some time the only solution was to hire men who would row out and push the garbage away with their paddles. Through mid-2000 the company collected a paltry $3.5 million from a $95 million investment. Enron also had other investment projects in Europe, Argentina, Brazil, Bolivia, Colombia, Mexico, Jamaica, Venezuela, elsewhere in South America and across the Caribbean.

==== India ====
Around 1992, Indian experts came to the United States to find energy investors to help with India's energy shortage problems. During December 1993, Enron finalized a 20-year power-purchase contract with the Maharashtra State Electricity Board. The contract allowed Enron to construct a massive 2,015 megawatt power plant on a remote volcanic bluff 100 miles (160 km) south of Mumbai through a two-phase project called Dabhol Power Station. Construction would be completed in two phases, and Enron would form the Dabhol Power Company to help manage the plant. The power project was the first step in a $20 billion scheme to help rebuild and stabilize India's power grid. Enron, GE (which was selling turbines to the project), and Bechtel (which was constructing the plant), each contributed 10% equity with the remaining 90% covered by the MSEB.

In 1996, when India's Congress Party was no longer in power, the Indian government assessed the project as being excessively expensive, refused to pay for the plant, and stopped construction. The MSEB was required by contract to continue to pay Enron plant maintenance charges, even if no power was purchased from the plant. The MSEB determined that it could not afford to purchase the power (at Rs. 8 per unit kWh) charged by Enron. The plant operator was unable to find alternate customers for Dabhol power due to the absence of a free market in the regulated structure of utilities in India.

By 2000, the Dabhol plant was almost complete and Phase 1 had begun producing power. Enron as a whole, however, was heavily overextended, and in the summer of that year Mark and all the key executives at Enron International were asked to resign from Enron to reshape the company and get rid of asset businesses. Shortly thereafter a payment dispute with MSEB ensued, and Enron issued a stop-work order on the plant in June 2001. From 1996 until Enron's bankruptcy in 2001 the company tried to revive the project and revive interest in India's need for the power plant without success. By December 2001 the Enron scandal and bankruptcy cut short any opportunity to revive the construction and complete the plant. In 2005, an Indian government-run company, Ratnagiri Gas and Power, was set up to finish construction on the Dabhol facility and operate the plant.

==== Project summer ====
During the summer of 2001, Enron attempted to sell several of Enron International's assets, many of which were not sold. The public and media believed it was unknown why Enron wanted to sell these assets, suspecting it was because Enron needed cash. Employees who worked with company assets were told in 2000 that Jeff Skilling believed that business assets were an outdated means of a company's worth, and instead he wanted to build a company based on "intellectual assets".

=== Enron Global Exploration & Production, Inc. ===
Enron Global Exploration & Production Inc. (EGEP) was an Enron subsidiary that was born from the split of domestic assets via EOG Resources (formerly Enron Oil and Gas EOG) and international assets via EGEP (formerly Enron Oil and Gas Int'l, Ltd EOGIL). Among the EGEP assets were the Panna-Mukta and the South Tapti fields, discovered by the Indian state-owned Oil and Natural Gas Corporation (ONGC), which operated the fields initially. December 1994, a joint venture began between ONGC (40%), Enron (30%) and Reliance (30%). Mid-year of 2002, British Gas (BG) completed the acquisition of EGEP's 30% share of the Panna-Mukta and Tapti fields for $350 million, a few months before Enron filed bankruptcy.

== Enron Prize for Distinguished Public Service ==
During the mid-1990s, Enron established an endowment for the Enron Prize for Distinguished Public Service, awarded by Rice University's Baker Institute to "recognize outstanding individuals for their contributions to public service". Recipients were:

- 1995: Colin Powell
- 1997: Mikhail Gorbachev
- 1999 (early): Eduard Shevardnadze
- 1999 (late): Nelson Mandela
- 2001: Alan Greenspan

Greenspan, because of his position as the Fed chairman, was not at liberty to accept the $10,000 honorarium, the $15,000 sculpture, nor the crystal trophy, but only accepted the "honor" of being named an Enron Prize recipient. The situation was further complicated because a few days earlier, Enron had filed paperwork admitting it had falsified financial statements for five years. Greenspan did not mention Enron a single time during his speech. At the ceremony, Ken Lay stated, "I'm looking forward to our first woman recipient." The next morning, it was reported in the Houston Chronicle that no decision had been made on whether the name of the prize would be changed. 19 days after the prize was awarded to Greenspan, Enron declared bankruptcy.

== Enron's influence on politics ==
- George W. Bush, sitting U.S. president at the time of Enron's collapse, received $312,500 to his campaigns and $413,800 to his presidential war chest and inaugural fund.
- Dick Cheney, sitting U.S. vice president at the time of Enron's collapse, met with Enron executives six times to develop a new energy policy. He refused to show minutes to Congress.
- John Ashcroft, the attorney general at the time, recused himself from the DOJ's investigation into Enron due to receiving $57,499 when running for a senate seat in 2000.
- Lawrence Lindsay, White House Economic Advisor at the time, made $50,000 as a consultant with Enron before moving to the White House in 2000.
- Karl Rove, White House senior advisor at the time, waited five months before selling $100,000 of Enron stock.
- Marc F. Racicot, Republican National Committee chairman nominee at the time, was handpicked by George W. Bush to serve as a lawyer with Bracewell LLP, a firm that lobbied for Enron.

== Cultural references ==
Enron has been featured since its bankruptcy in popular culture, including in The Simpsons episodes "That '90s Show" (Homer buys Enron stock while Marge chooses to keep her own Microsoft shares) and "Special Edna", which features a scene of an Enron-themed amusement park ride. The 2007 film Bee Movie also featured a joke reference to a parody company of Enron called "Honron" (a play on the words honey and Enron). The 2003 documentary The Corporation made frequent references to Enron post-bankruptcy, calling the company a "bad apple".

In October 2002, Enron was awarded the satirical Ig Nobel Prize in Economics for "adapting the mathematical concept of imaginary numbers for use in the business world". The various former members of the Enron management team all refused to accept the award in person, although no reason was given at the time.

In 2002, the Playboy magazine featured a nude pictorial "Women of Enron", with ten former and contemporary Enron female employees. The women said they posed for the fun and to earn some money.

== 2024 satirical reboot and meme coin ==
On December 2, 2024, a new tweet was posted on the @Enron X account. The tweet had the caption "We're back. Can we talk?", along with a promotional video. Viewers also noticed that the website enron.com was also functional. The replies alleged a potential cryptocurrency scam, but others pointed to the new terms of service including a clause explicitly stating that the content on the website was parody protected under the First Amendment. Many pointed out that this was likely a joke, as the domain seemed to be registered by Peter McIndoe, a performance artist and founder of Birds Aren't Real. Additionally, the rights to the Enron name had been purchased at auction by The College Company for $275 in 2020. On December 9, it was announced that the CEO of Enron was Connor Gaydos, another cofounder of The College Company and Birds Aren't Real. It was also announced that Enron planned to hold a new "Enron Power Summit" on January 6, 2025. On December 12, the Twitter page @Pubity posted video of Gaydos being pied in the face. Many viewers quickly assumed the incident was staged, and it may have been a parody of an incident when Jeff Skilling was pied in the face by a California woman.

On January 6, 2025, Enron announced the Enron Egg, its first new product in 20 years. Gaydos claimed that the product was a micro nuclear reactor capable of powering a suburban home for 10 years using 20% enriched uranium in the form of uranium zirconium hydride. The announcement supposedly took place at the previously announced "Enron Power Summit," but the Houston Chronicle was unable to confirm that such an event actually took place.

On February 4, 2025, Enron launched a crypto token named $ENRON on the Solana blockchain as part of its satire, at one point trading with a market capitalization of $700 million before the price fell at least 76% within 24 hours of launch.

== See also ==
- The Smartest Guys in the Room, a 2003 book by Bethany McLean and Peter Elkind that examines the collapse of the Enron Corporation
- Enron: The Smartest Guys in the Room, a 2005 documentary film based on the book
- The Crooked E: The Unshredded Truth About Enron, a television movie aired by CBS in January 2003 based on the book Anatomy of Greed by Brian Cruver
- Pipe Dreams: Greed, Ego, and the Death of Enron, a book by Robert Bryce
- ENRON, a 2009 play by British playwright Lucy Prebble
- Dot-com bubble
- Theranos
- FTX

== Bibliography ==
- Bryce, Robert (2002). Pipe Dreams: Greed, Ego, and the Death of Enron. New York: PublicAffairs. ISBN 1-58648-138-X..
- Brewer, Lynn; Hansen, Matthew Scott (2002). House of Cards: Confessions of An Enron Executive. College Station, TX: Virtualbookworm.com Publishing. ISBN 1-58939-248-5.
- Eichenwald, Kurt (2005). Conspiracy of Fools: A True Story. New York: Broadway Books. ISBN 0-7679-1178-4.
- Fusaro, Peter C.; Miller, Ross M. (2002). What Went Wrong at Enron: Everyone's Guide to the Largest Bankruptcy in U.S. History. Hoboken, NJ: Wiley. ISBN 0-471-26574-8..
- Fox, Loren (2003). Enron: The Rise and Fall. Hoboken, NJ: Wiley. ISBN 978-0471237600.
- Judith Haney Enron's Bust: Was it the result of Over-Confidence or a Confidence Game? USNewsLink/ December 13, 2001.
- Grigg, Neil S. (2011). Water Finance: Public Responsibilities and Private Opportunities. Hoboken, NJ: John Wiley & Sons.
- Marc Hodak, The Enron Scandal, Organizational Behavior Research Center Papers (SSRN), June 4, 2007.
- McLean, Bethany; Elkind, Peter (2003). The Smartest Guys in the Room: The Amazing Rise and Scandalous Fall of Enron. New York: Portfolio. ISBN 1-59184-008-2.
- Sharp, David J. (2006). Cases in Business Ethics. Thousand Oaks, CA: Sage. ISBN 1412909244.
- Swartz, Mimi; Watkins, Sherron (2003). Power Failure: The Inside Story of the Collapse of Enron. New York: Doubleday. ISBN 0-385-50787-9.
- Daniel Scotto "American Financial Analyst: The First Analyst to recommend the selling of Enron Stock".
- Calkins, Laurel Brubaker (November 4, 2004). "Enron Fraud Trial Ends in 5 Convictions". The Washington Post.
