= Women in Research Ireland =

Ireland charity

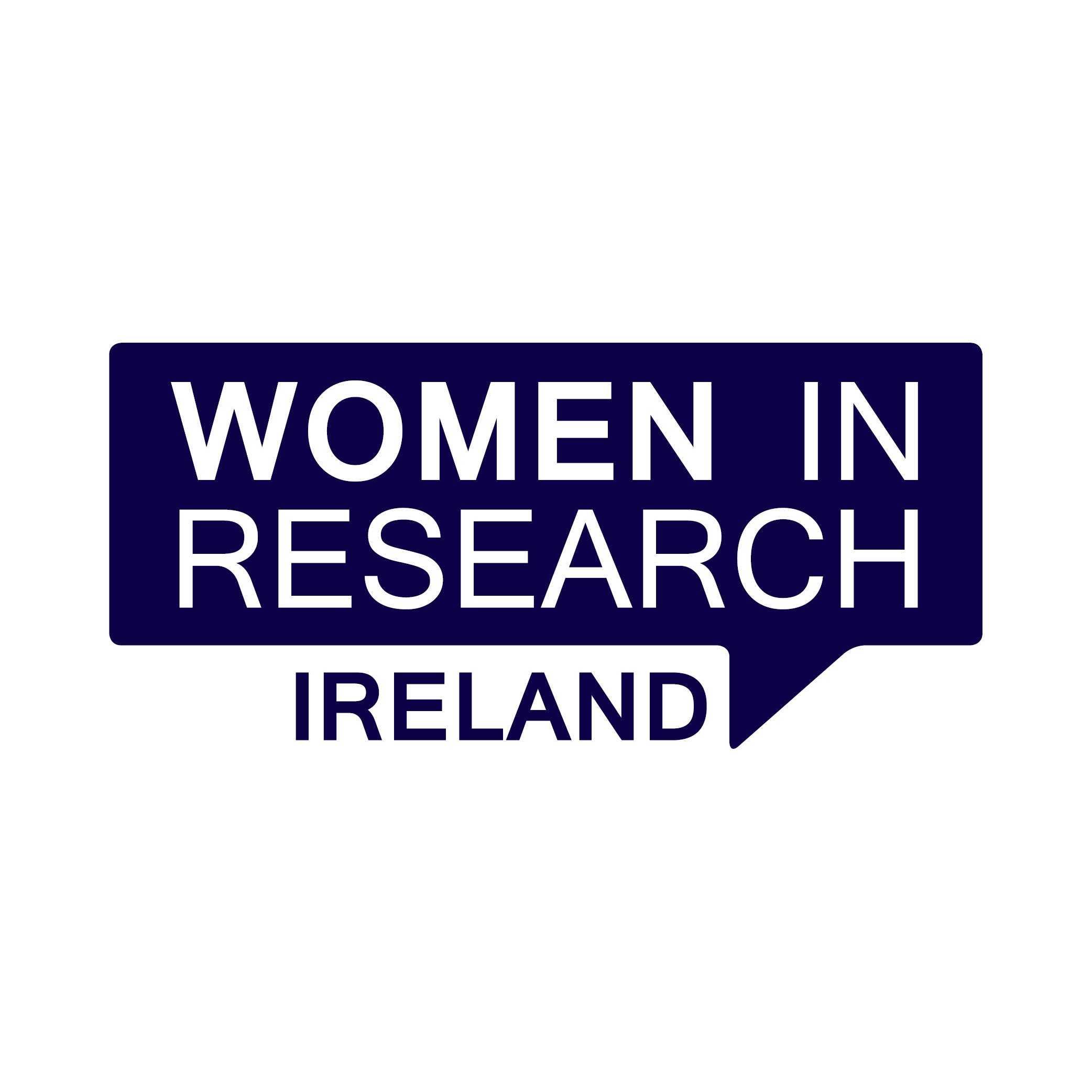
- Women in Research Ireland's current logo
- Formation: 8 March 2017
- Founded at: Trinity College Dublin (TCD)
- Type: Charity
- Registration no.: 20200957
- Headquarters: Dublin, Ireland
- Director (s): Dr Joanne Kenney, Dr Susan Fetics
- Website: womeninresearch.ie

Women in Research Ireland (WIRI) is a charity based in Dublin, Ireland, and a group member of the National Women's Council of Ireland. WIRI's goal is to build a community which connects and unites women, minorities, non-binary and other underrepresented groups in research and academia by raising awareness to create cultural changes. Since its foundation in 2017, WIRI hosts free, monthly events where a safe environment is ensured for honest and informative conversations. Today, WIRI maintains its platform in Ireland for unheard voices in research and academia. Dr Arjumand Younus and Dr Valesca Lima are the current directors of Women in Research IE since November 2021. Past directors include Dr Joanne Kenney, Dr Susan Fetics, Dr Rebecca Amet, Dr Karen Slattery and Martha Gulman. For full list of committee members see www.womeninresearch.ie/committee.

== History ==
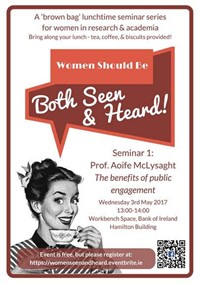
Women should be both seen and heard” Seminar 1 Event Poster

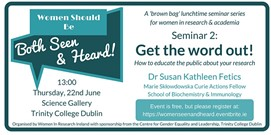
Women should be both seen and heard” Seminar 2 Event Poster

Women in Research Ireland (WIRI) was established at Trinity College Dublin (TCD) on 8 March 2017, marking International Women's day (IWD). Inspired by her great-grandaunt, Mary O'Toole, who established the Women's City Club of Washington D.C. in 1919, Sadhbh Byrne organized a panel discussion, having recognized an appetite for conversation around women, minorities and other unheard voices in research and academia. Next, on May 3, Byrne launched “Women should be both seen and heard - a brown bag lunchtime seminar series”. The inaugural speaker was Professor Aoife McLysaght, head of the Smurfit Institute of Genetics at TCD. It was held at the Workbench Space in Bank of Ireland on TCD campus. Attending this event were Susan Fetics and Martha Gulman. Fetics and Gulman were inspired to join Byrne and build WIRI to be a community with free monthly events. Fetics presented “Get the Word Out! How to Educate the Public about Your Research” at WIRI's second event in June 2017. The event was recorded and live streamed on WIRI's Facebook page for those unable to attend due to work constraints, family obligations or health issues. In total, there were 10 seminars in this monthly lunchtime series, discussing topics such as: mentoring, women in politics, feminism and how to build a more sustainable city. In 2018, WIRI became a registered charity in Ireland (RCN 20200957) under the directorship of Amet and Gulman.

== Expanding the Platform: Workshops, Collaborations, Open Mic, Politics and Webinars ==
WIRI soon grew beyond the lunchtime lectures. The first workshop entitled “Your Best Media Self” was held in May 2018. Angela Saini spoke at an evening event hosted by WIRI for Dublin Culture Night in September 2018. During Science week 2018, WIRI hosted a panels discussion entitled “Science Heroes” featuring three members from the Women in Walls campaign. WIRI welcomed Senator Ivana Bacik to discuss gender pay inequalities . In 2019, Prof Celeste Kidd spoke of her involvement in the #metoo movement. Additionally, WIRI held its first open mic night in Temple Bar, Dublin. At Science Gallery Dublin, WIRI welcomed TDs Regina Doherty to discuss challenges facing minorities in Ireland and Jim Daly to discuss mental health reform in Ireland. In 2020, amidst the COVID-19 pandemic, WIRI transitioned to online events using the Zoom conferencing platform. Early speakers included Dame Professor Jocelyn Belle Burnell, Dr. Ebun Joseph and Angela Saini. WIRI has also joined the national conversation in Ireland regarding the uncertainty of an academic career with a specific focus on the difficulties for women and minorities. In 2021, WIRI contributed a submission on the Pre-Legislative Scrutiny of the Higher Education Authority Bill 2021 as part of the public consultation stage, this contribution was acknowledged in the report published on Tuesday 28 September 2021 by The Joint Committee on Education, Further and Higher Education, Research, Innovation and Science, after referral from the Minister for Further and Higher Education, Research, Innovation and Science, Simon Harris TD, in May 2021.

With its established platform, WIRI remains committed to free events for anyone to attend. At every event, a safe environment is established, and time is allocated for questions from attendees, thereby allowing an open conversation and increased understanding to foster positive change. Resources stemming from the discussion are shared for additional assistance. The atmosphere of the events is in alignment with WIRI's mission to build a community that unites women, minorities and other underrepresented groups by maintaining the established platform for unheard voices to discuss issues and promote change.

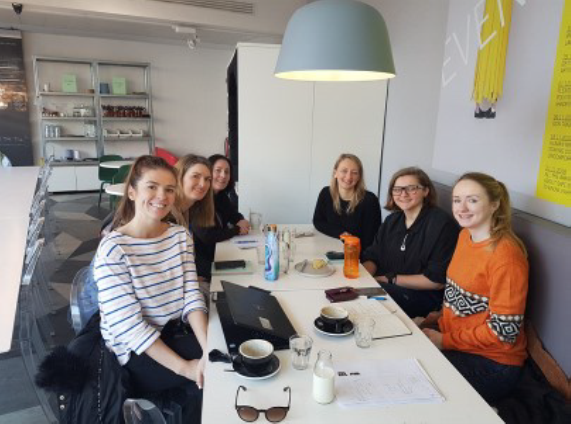
WIRI committee members meeting on IWD2019 at Science Gallery Dublin
