= Forough Alaei =

Iranian photojournalist

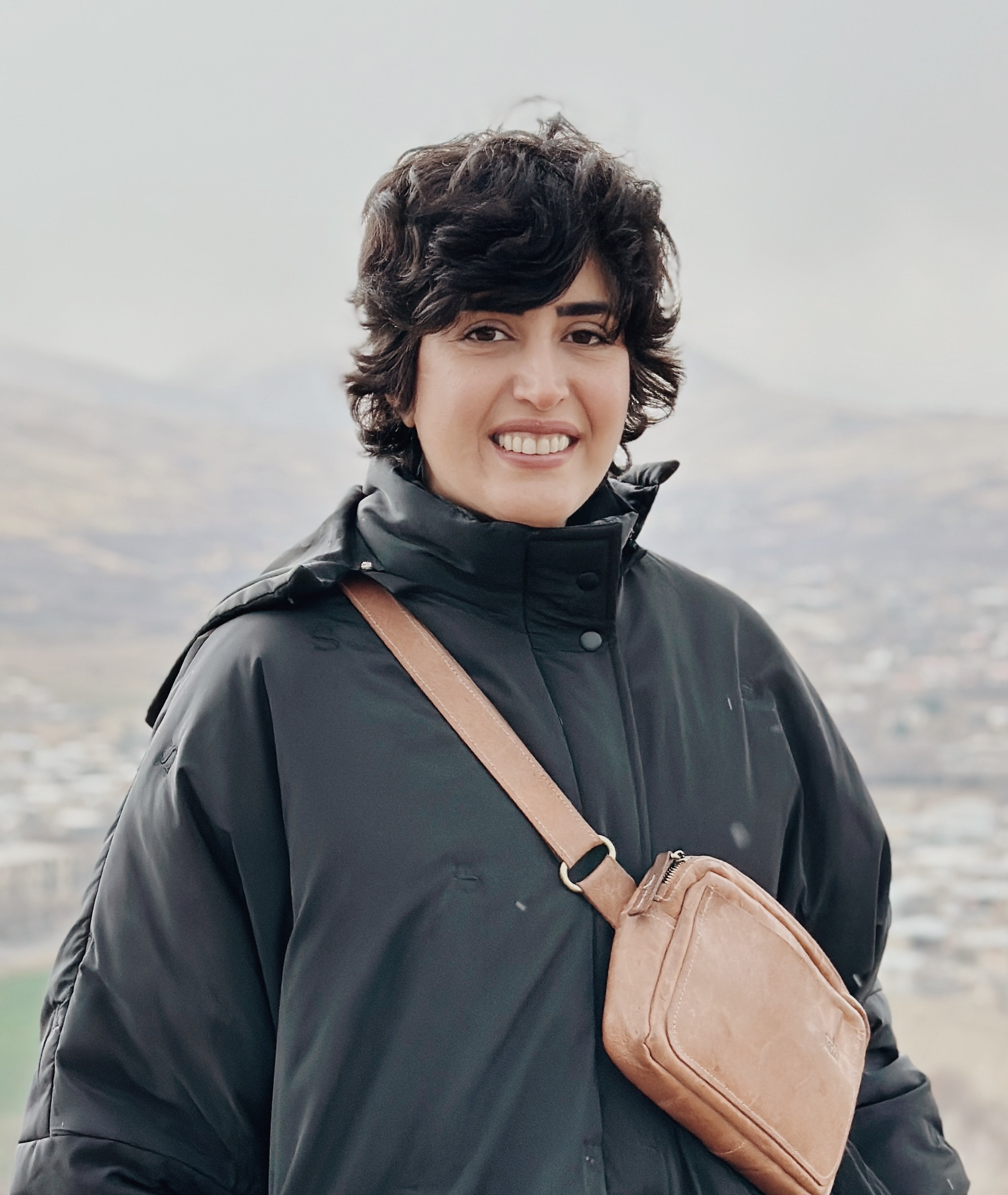
- Born: May 11, 1989 (age 36); Tehran, Iran
- Occupation: Photojournalist
- Years active: Since 2019
- Notable work: World Press Photo Awards 2019

Forough Alaei (Persian: فروغ علائی; born 1989) is an Iranian documentary photographer and photojournalist. Her work focuses on women’s rights, youth culture, and social justice in Iran. She is a recipient of the World Press Photo Award and Getty Images Editorial Grant.. Her photographs have been published in TIME, National Geographic and The New Yorker.

== Life and work ==
Alaei was born in 1989 in Iran. She studied law and was also passionate about painting before pursuing photography. She began photographing in 2015 and shortly after became a photojournalist. She later shifted her focus toward documentary photography and filmmaking.

In 2015, Alaei began working as a photojournalist for Donya-e Eghtesad, a major Iranian economic newspaper. She became internationally recognized for her long-term projects on Iranian women, including female football fans disguising themselves as men to enter stadiums.

On 12 August 2019, Alaei was arrested by Iran’s Islamic Revolutionary Guard Corps (IRGC) at the entrance of Tehran’s Azadi Stadium while covering women’s attempts to attend football matches and released on bail five days later.

In 2019, her project Crying for Freedom was exhibited worldwide as part of the World Press Photo global tour. She has also been involved in the VII Photo Agency Mentor Program (2019–2021).

== Awards ==
- 2019: World Press Photo Award, First Place, Sports Stories
- 2019: Pictures of the Year International (POYi), First Place, Multimedia Daily Life
- 2019: Istanbul Photo Awards, First Place, Sports Stories
- 2020: Getty Images Editorial Grant
- 2022: Selected for TIME Magazine Best Photojournalists and Best Portraits Cover

== Notable projects ==
=== Underneath the Calm Streets of Iran (2022–ongoing) ===
A long-term series begun after the death of Mahsa Amini, portraying Iran’s new generation of women in nontraditional roles such as motorbike riders, car mechanics, dancers, and street athletes. Alaei uses saturated colors, strong lighting, and high contrast to convey the energy of Gen Z. The project was shortlisted for the Leica Oskar Barnack Award in 2022,

=== Crying for Freedom (2019) ===
A photo series documenting female football fans in Iran who disguised themselves as men to attend matches. Alaei herself disguised as a man to experience and document the situation firsthand. The project won First Prize, World Press Photo in the Sports Stories category (2019) and brought her international recognition.

=== Iran’s Daughters of the Sea ===
A documentary project about the women of Hengam Island, in southern Iran, who work as fishers and serve as the main breadwinners for their families. The work highlights women’s resilience and independence in a male-dominated field. Published in several newspapers such as The New Yorker.

=== Daily Life in Times of War (2025) ===
During the outbreak of the Twelve-Day War between Israel and Iran, Alaei moved with her family to northern Iran. She documented intimate, everyday moments of family life amid the fear and uncertainty of war. The project contrasts external crisis with private resilience. Published in the Le Monde and Spiegel magazine.

=== New Face of Iran / New Generation ===
A series about young Iranians born after the 1980s, who did not experience the Iranian Revolution or the Iran–Iraq War. The project portrays their pursuit of personal freedoms, modern lifestyles, music, animal rights, and the rejection of traditional taboos. Alaei approaches them with intimacy and empathy, emphasizing their individuality.
