= List of covers of Time magazine (2020s) =

This is a list of covers of Time magazine between 2020 and 2029. Time was first published in 1923. As Time became established as one of the United States' leading news magazines, an appearance on the cover of Time became an indicator of notability, fame or notoriety. Such features were accompanied by articles.

European, Middle Eastern, African, Asian and South Pacific versions of the magazine were published in addition to the United States edition. This article distinguishes versions when the covers are different.

For other decades, see Lists of covers of Time magazine.

== 2020 ==
Date	Persons or topics	Caption
January 20	Nancy Pelosi	Her Gamble
January 27	Jared Kushner	The Family Business
February 3	The Earth	Youthquake
February 10	Joe Biden	What Makes Joe Run
February 17	Illustration of Xi Jinping	China's Test
March 2	Martin Luther King Jr.	His Legacy
March 16	Various covers of influential women throughout history	100 Women of the Year
March 30	Coronavirus disease 2019	New Coronavirus 2019
April 6	José Andrés	Apart. Not Alone
April 20	An Anesthesiologist	Special Report: Heroes of the front lines
April 27	Street art in Paris on April 11	Finding Hope
May 11	A NOPE! sign	The Long road back
May 18	US unemployment graph from 1933 to 2020	The Great Reckoning
May 25	Illustration of Donald Trump	There's a right way to reopen America. This isn't it.
June 1	Photograph by Hannah Beier	Generation Pandemic
June 15	Painting by Titus Kaphar	...Trayvon Martin, Yvette Smith, Eric Garner, Michael Brown, Lacquan McDonald, Tanisha Anderson, Akai Gurley, Tamir Rice, Jerame Reid, Natasha McKenna, Eric Harris, Walter Scott, Freddie Gray, William Chapman, Sandra Bland, Darrius Stewart, Samuel Dubose, Janet Wilson, Calin Roquemore, Alton Sterling, Philando Castile, Joseph Mann, Terence Crutcher, Chad Robertson, Jordan Edwards, Aaron Bailey, Stephon Clark, Danny Ray Thomas, Antwon Rose, Botham Jean, Atatiana Jefferson, Michael Dean, Ahmaud Arbery, Breonna Taylor, George Floyd... (Names around the red border)
June 22	George Floyd Protests	The Overdue Awakening
July 6	Painting by Charly Palmer	America Must Change
July 20	A graph of climate change over the last 2 centuries	One Last Chance
August 3	John Lewis	1940-2020
August 17	Illustration of Donald Trump and coronavirus disease 2019 floating in a body of water in front of the White House	The Plague Election
August 31	Image of a black and red Flag of the United States being sewn	The New American Revolution
September 21	A list of dates from February 29 through September 8 and the US coronavirus disease 2019 death toll with "200,000" highlighted	An American Failure
October 5	Various covers, including Megan Thee Stallion, Anthony Fauci, Dwyane Wade and Gabrielle Union, The Weeknd, and more	Time 100
October 19	An image of coronavirus disease 2019 viral cells exiting the White House	(no caption)
November 2	An illustration by Shepard Fairey of a woman wearing a face-covering with an image of a ballot box	For the first time in history, Time replaced its logo with the word "VOTE"
November 16	An image of a distressed face mask designed to look like an American flag	American Reality
November 23	A photograph of President-Elect Joe Biden and Vice President-Elect Kamala Harris taken on November 7 at their victory speech	A Time to Heal
November 30	A photo-illustration by Sean Freeman and Eve Steben of a snowy and icy window	The Covid Winter Vaccines are coming. So are the hardest months.
December 14	A photograph by Sharif Hamza of Gitanjali Rao	Kid of the Year
December 21	Joe Biden and Kamala Harris	Person of the Year

== 2021 ==
Date	Persons or topics	Caption
January 18	U.S. Capitol under attack	Democracy under attack
February 1	Illustration of Joe Biden in the Oval Office	Day One
February 15	Amanda Gorman	The Black Renaissance
March 1	Six different covers, including Brit Bennett, Telfar Clemens, Dua Lipa, Sanna Marin, Maitreyi Ramakrishnan and Marcus Rashford.	The Next 100
March 15		Women and the Pandemic
March 29		We Are Not Silent
April 12	Twyla Joseph	The Lost Year
April 26		Climate Is Everything
May 10	George Floyd	Justice Not Yet For All
May 24	"God Bless The Child" (painting by Jordan Casteel)	Visions of Equity
June 7		Will Return: The Great Reopening
June 21		We'll Never Be The Same
July 5		The History Wars
July 19	Naomi Osaka	It's O.K. To Not Be O.K.
August 2	Various "Help Wanted" signs	Rethinking Work
August 23	Jared Isaacman, Sian Proctor, Hayley Arceneaux, Christopher Sembroski	Three Days That Could Change Humanity; Inside Inspiration4 / The First All-Civilian Trip Into Orbit
September 13	16 bus drivers in New Mexico who delivered lunches to students during the pandemic	The People Who Saved A School Year
September 27	Seven different covers	The World's Most Influential People
October 11	Jane Goodall	The Enduring Hope of Jane Goodall
October 25	Two different covers. Timothée Chalamet and Mark Zuckerberg	
November 8		Last call.
November 22	Shannon Brewer	The Last Abortion Clinic
December 27	Elon Musk	Person of the Year for 2021

== 2022 ==
Date	Persons or topics	Caption
January 17	Shonda Rhimes	TV's Greatest
January 31	Illustration of Joe Biden in the Oval Office	Year One
January 31	Alexei Navalny	The Man Putin Fears
January 31	Chloe Kim	Solid Gold
February 14		How COVID Ends
February 14		The Crisis that could change Europe forever
February 28	Daniel Motaung	Inside Facebook's African Sweatshop
February 28	Orion Jean	Kid of the Year
March 14	4 different covers, including Kerry Washington, Kacey Musgraves, Zahra Joya, Amal Clooney	Women of the Year
March 14	Illustration of the Flag of Ukraine	Volodymyr Zelenskyy and the Heroes of Ukraine
March 28	Vitalik Buterin	The Prince of Crypto has Concerns
March 28		The Resilience of Ukraine and The Agony of Ukraine
April 11	3 different covers, including Mindy Kaling, BTS, Andy Jassy	100 Most Influential Companies
April 25	Shohei Ohtani	It's Sho-time
April 25		Earth, Inc.
May 9	Elon Musk holding the logo of Twitter	What everyone gets wrong about Elon Musk
May 9	Olaf Scholz	Germany's Moment
May 9	Volodymyr Zelenskyy	How Zelensky Leads
Spring	Olaf Scholz, Ursula von der Leyen	Together Again
May 23	Luiz Inácio Lula da Silva	Lula's Second Act
May 23	Olga Rudenko	Witnessing a War
May 23		The Cold Truth
June 6	5 different covers, including Mary J. Blige, Zendaya, Tim Cook, Mía Mottley, Simu Liu	Time 100
June 20	Ursula von der Leyen	Europe's Power Broker
June 20		When are we going to do something?
July 4		The Oceans Issue
July 25		Where the Abortion Fight Goes Next
July 25	Shinzo Abe	
July 25	Olena Zelenska	Her Private War
August 8	Brittney Griner	Brittney Griner and her fight for freedom
August 8		Into the Metaverse
August 22	Hasina Najibi and Raihana Rahimi	Stories of Hope, Fear & Resilience
August 22		Katrina Babies
August 22		How to do more good
September 12	Gabriel Boric	The New Guard
September 12	Cast of The Rings of Power	TV's Biggest Bet
September 12	Serena Williams	The Greatest
September 26	Elizabeth II	The Queen
September 26		Climate's New Era
October 10	SZA, Keke Palmer, Sydney Sweeney, Farwiza Farhan	Time 100 Next
October 10	Valerii Zaluzhnyi	The General
October 10		The Defenders
October 24	Abraham Lincoln	How our greatest president saved democracy and we can too
October 24	Bukayo Saka	Next Generation Leaders
November 7		The Planet We Made
November 21		Democracy
November 21	2022 FIFA World Cup	The Dangerous Game
December 5	Steven Spielberg	Spielberg.
December 26	Volodymyr Zelenskyy	Person of the Year

== 2023 ==
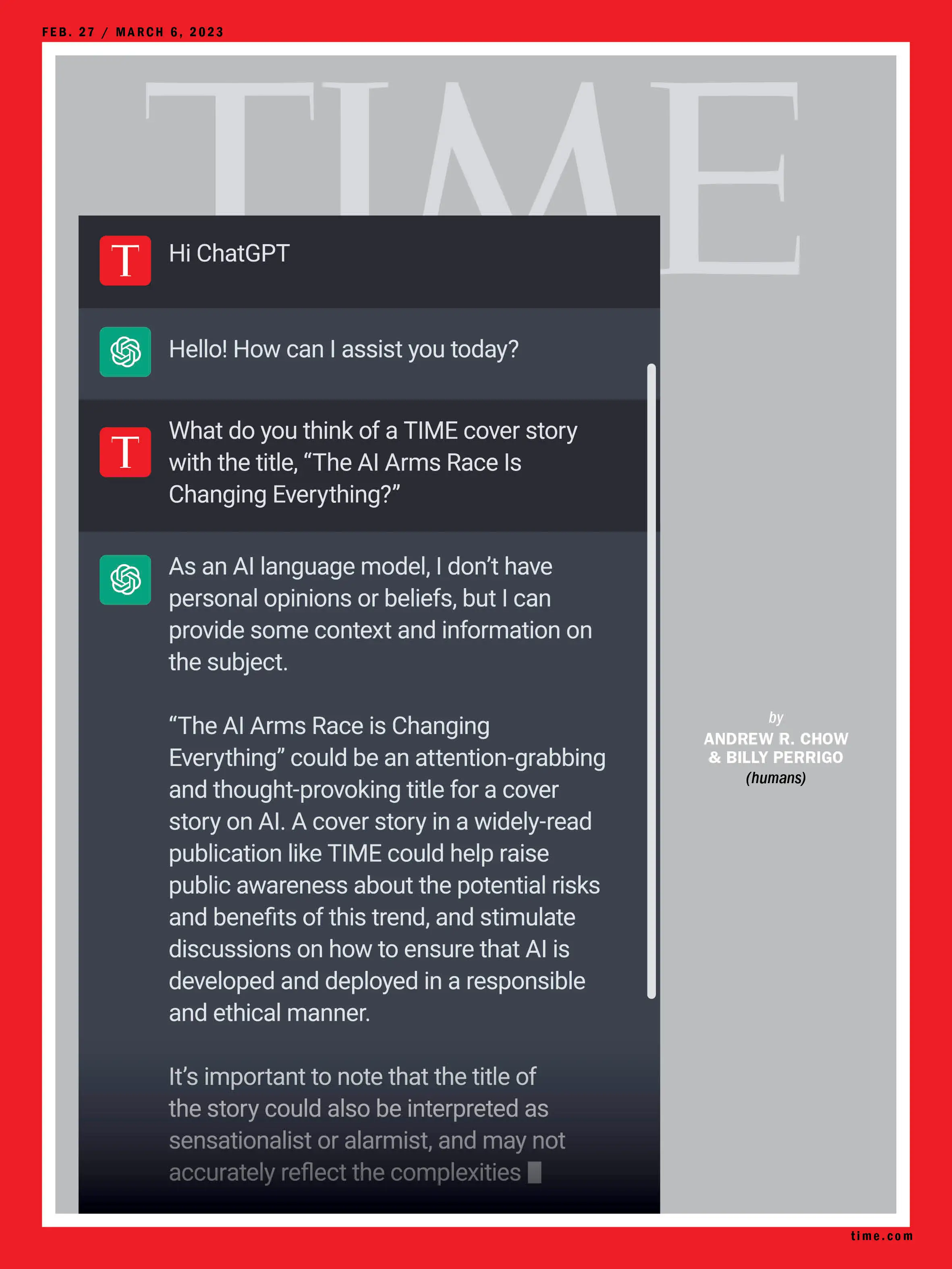
Cover for February 27, 2023, with ChatGPT

Date	Persons or topics	Caption
January 16		The Secrets of Happiness Experts
January 30		Zip It!
February 13		Division & Destiny
February 27	ChatGPT	The AI Arms Race is Changing Everything
March 13		Our 100th Year
March 27	The Giza pyramid complex	The World's Greatest Places
April 10	Bad Bunny	El Mundo De Bad Bunny
April 24		Unprecedented
May 22	Charles III	Finally, King
June 12	Ron DeSantis	What Ron DeSantis Means for America
July 3	Kim Kardashian	The 100 Most Influential Companies
July 24	Hari Nef, Alexandra Shipp, Margot Robbie, Issa Rae, Kate McKinnon	Barbie's World
August 14	John Fetterman	Out of the Darkness
September 4	Donald Trump	Does this Ride Ever End?
September 25	Jalen Hurts	Time 100 Next
October 9	Elon Musk	Elon Musk's Fight for the Future of AI
October 23	Deion Sanders	The Believer
November 6	Jonathan Polin, Rachel Goldberg-Polin	The Hostage Nightmare
November 20		The Horror of Gaza
December 4	Sultan Al Jaber	Man in the Middle
December 6	Taylor Swift	Person of the Year

== 2024 ==
Date	Persons or topics	Caption
January 22	Antony Blinken	The Envoy
February 12	Issa Rae	Working To Close the Racial Wealth Gap
February 26	MrBeast	How He Became the Most Watched Person In the World
March 11	Greta Gerwig	Women of the Year
March 25	Evan Gershkovich	The Fight to Free Evan Gershkovich
April 8	Jane Fonda	Jane Fonda's Next Act
April 29	Patrick Mahomes	The World's Most Influential People
May 13	Coco Gauff	Why the Tennis Star is Playing for Herself Now
May 27	Donald Trump	If He Wins
June 10	Selena Gomez	The 100 Most Influential Companies
June 24		Donald Trump Convicted in Historic New York Hush-Money Trial
July 15	Melinda French Gates	Melinda French Gates Is Going It Alone
August 5	Kamala Harris	Why Joe Biden Dropped Out
August 26	Kamala Harris	
September 16	Nayib Bukele	The Strongman
September 30	Donald Trump	In Trouble
October 14	JD Vance	The New Right
October 28	Nicola Coughlan	Next Generation Leaders
November 11		Your Vote is Safe
November 25	A photograph of President-elect Donald Trump during his victory speech	President-elect Donald Trump
December 11	Elon Musk	Citizen Musk
December 30	Donald Trump	Person of the Year

== 2025 ==
Date	Persons or topics	Caption
January 27	Jimmy Carter	Jimmy Carter 1924 – 2024
February 10	Donald Trump	He's Back
February 27	Colman Domingo	The Revolutionary Colman Domingo
March 10	Nicole Kidman	Women of the Year
March 24	Kazakh eagle hunter	The World's Greatest Places
April 14	Volodymyr Zelenskyy (U.S., Europe, Middle East, and Africa)	The Endgame
April 14	Catherine Coleman Flowers (Asia)	6 leaders working to save the planet
April 14	The social media lockup (South Pacific)	Inside the bold plan to make kids unplug
April 28	Demi Moore (U.S.)	The World's Most Influential People
April 28	Ed Sheeran (South Pacific)	The World's Most Influential People
April 28	Serena Williams (Asia)	The World's Most Influential People
April 28	Demis Hassabis (Europe, Middle East, and Africa)	The World's Most Influential People
April 28	Snoop Dogg (South America)	The World's Most Influential People
May 12	Remus (dire wolf) (Asia)	~~Extinct~~ This is Remus. He's a dire wolf. The first to exist in over 10,000 years. Endangered species could be changed forever.
May 12	Holding On (Blue) by Tajh Rust (U.S.)	Five years later - America looks for a way forward after George Floyd
May 12	Pope Francis (Europe, Middle East, and Africa)	1936-2025
May 12	The Big Promise (South Pacific)	A New Weight-Loss Pill Could Transform The Future Of Health
May 26	Donald Trump (U.S.)	Dealing with it.
May 26	Pope Leo XIV (Europe, Middle East, and Africa)	An American Pope: Leo XIV
May 26	Tedros Adhanom Ghebreyesus (Asia)	The 100 most influential health leaders
May 26	Taylor Jenkins Reid (South Pacific)	Book Smart.
June 9	Illustration : Lost - The Democrats (U.S.)	Inside the Party's Plan to Find Its Way Back
June 9	Audra McDonald (Europe, Middle East, and Africa)	Broadway's Greatest
June 9	David Beckham (Asia, South Pacific)	The 100 Most Influential Leaders In Philanthropy
June 23	Illustration by Edel Rodríguez (U.S.)	Statue of Liberty whose flame takes the shape of Donald Trump's screaming face, surrounded by barbed wire on a black background.
June 23	Orb (Europe, Middle East, and Africa)	Are you human? Sam Altman wants to find out
June 23	The Oceans Issue (photo by Joshua Irwandi) (Asia, South Pacific)	Fighting for the Future as Waters Rise
July 7	Ali Khamenei (Europe, Middle East, and Africa)	The New Middle East
July 7	Ryan Reynolds (Asia, South Pacific)	How Ryan Reynolds rewrote the script with maximum effort
July 7	Tekedra Mawakana & Dmitri Dolgov (U.S.)	How Waymo is taking the driver's seat
July 28	Robert Francis Prevost with his mother & brothers in 1959 (Asia, South Pacific)	The Making of the Pope
July 28	Kai Cenat (U.S.)	The most influential digital voices
July 28	Illustration by Simón Prades (Europe, Middle East, and Africa)	The Kidnappings - Thousands of children were taken from Ukraine by Russian forces. The fight to get them back.
August 18	Giorgia Meloni (Europe, Middle East, and Africa)	Where Giorgia Meloni is Leading Europe
August 18	Erling Haaland (Asia)	Goal oriented
August 18	Photo by Ali Jadallah (South Pacific)	The Gaza Tragedy
August 18	Mike Johnson (U.S.)	The Survivor
September 8	Zohran Mamdani (U.S.)	The meaning of Zohran Mamdani
September 8	Photo by Élise Blanchard (Europe, Middle East, and Africa)	All we have left is fear
September 8	Illustration by Refik Anadol (Asia, South Pacific)	The 100 most influential people in Artificial Intelligence
September 29	Photo by Moises Saman (Europe, Middle East, and Africa)	The Forgotten Crisis
September 29	Tejasvi Manoj (South America)	Kid of the year
September 29	Charlie Kirk (U.S.)	Enough. The Killing of Charlie Kirk and the Epidemic of American Political Violence
September 29	Lee Jae-myung (Asia, South Pacific)	The Bridge
October 13	Bruce Springsteen (U.S.)	The Boss
October 13	Tate McRae (Asia)	The world's most influential rising stars
October 13	Jonathan Bailey (Europe, Middle East, and Africa)	The world's most influential rising stars
October 13	April Koh (South Pacific)	The world's most influential rising stars
October 27	Eli Sharabi (U.S., Europe, Middle East, and Africa)	I SPENT 491 DAYS AS A HOSTAGE OF HAMAS. THIS IS MY STORY
October 27	Stranger Things (Asia)	The end of Stranger Things
October 27	Figure 03 (South Pacific)	Best Inventions of 2025
November 10	Donald Trump (U.S., Europe, Middle East, and Africa)	Trump's world
November 10	Illustration by Michael Papadakis (Asia, South Pacific)	The most influential climate leaders
November 24	Lindsey Vonn (U.S.)	Her Comeback - Lindsey Vonn seeks Olympic glory once again
November 24	Alice Charton (Asia, Europe, Middle East, and Africa, South Pacific)	Seeing the future
December 8	January 2025 Southern California wildfires photo by Robyn Beck (U.S.)	The Aftermath
December 8	Photo by Britta Jaschinski (Asia, Europe, Middle East, and Africa, South Pacific)	Best Photos of the Year
December 29	Illustration of Artificial intelligence	The architects of AI

Previous	Lists of covers of Time magazine	Next
2010s	2020s	2030s
