= Certified Fraud Examiner =

Credential on anti-fraud

The Certified Fraud Examiner (CFE) is a credential awarded by the Association of Certified Fraud Examiners (ACFE) since 1989. Founded in 1988 by Joseph T. Wells, the ACFE association is a provider of anti-fraud training and education.

== Requirements ==
To become a Certified Fraud Examiner (CFE), one must meet the following requirements:

- Be an Associate Member of the ACFE in good standing
- Meet minimum academic and professional requirements (undergraduate degree and professional experience (Note: a combination of graduate or post-graduate education and experience can be used to increase eligibility, however most importantly a candidate must score 40 points or above based on eligibility criteria).
- Be of high moral character
- Agree to abide by the Bylaws and Code of Professional Ethics of the Association of Certified Fraud Examiners
- Pass the CFE Examination

=== Academic requirements ===
Generally, applicants for CFE certification must have a minimum of a bachelor's degree or equivalent from an institution of higher education. Two years of professional experience related to fraud can be substituted for each year of college.

=== Professional requirements ===
At the time of certification, at least two years of professional experience in a field either directly or indirectly related to the detection or deterrence of fraud is required. The ACFE recognizes the following areas as qualified professional experience:

- Accounting and auditing
- Criminology and sociology (sociology is acceptable only if it relates to fraud.)
- Fraud investigation
- Loss prevention (experience as a security guard or equivalent is not acceptable)
- Law relating to fraud

Other experience can qualify, but must be reviewed for applicability.

=== Moral character ===
The ACFE will require references attesting to one's character before granting the certificate.

=== Adhere to the Code of Ethics ===
Per the ACFE website, the code of ethics states that a Certified Fraud Examiner shall:

- Demonstrate a commitment to professionalism and diligence in his or her duties.
- Not engage in any illegal or unethical conduct, or any activity which constitutes a conflict of interest.
- Exhibit the highest level of integrity in the performance of all professional assignments and will accept only assignments for which there is reasonable expectation that the assignment will be completed with professional competence.
- Comply with lawful orders of the courts and testify to matters truthfully and without bias or prejudice.
- Obtain evidence or other documentation to establish a reasonable basis for any opinion rendered. No opinion shall be expressed regarding the guilt or innocence of any person or party.
- Not reveal any confidential information without proper authorization.
- Reveal all pertinent material matters discovered during the course of an examination.
- Continually strive to increase the competence and effectiveness of professional services performed under his or her direction.

== Notable CFEs ==
- Cynthia Cooper, whistleblower of the WorldCom accounting scandal
- Joseph Gutheinz, Omniplan Task Force Leader, largest count conviction in NASA history
- Harry Markopolos, whistleblower of the Bernard Madoff scandal
- David P. Weber, former U.S. Securities and Exchange Commission (SEC) Chief Investigator, and whistleblower.
