= Elizabeth M. Brannon =

Neuroscientist

Elizabeth M. Brannon is an American neuroscientist. She serves as Edmund J. and Louise W. Kahn Term Chair in the Natural Sciences at the University of Pennsylvania. Brannon's research, focused on comparative cognition, numerical cognition, and educational neuroscience, has earned an h-index of 68.

== Education ==
Brannon earned her undergraduate degree in biological anthropology from the University of Pennsylvania. She then attended Columbia University, earning an MA in biological anthropology and a Ph.D. in psychology.

== Works ==
- Cantlon, J.F.; Platt, M.L.; Brannon, E.M. (2009). "Beyond the number domain. Invited review". Trends in Cognitive Sciences. 13 (2): 83–91. doi:10.1016/j.tics.2008.11.007. PMC 2709421. PMID 19131268.
- Starr, A.; Libertus, M.E.; Brannon, E.M. (2013). "Infants show ratio dependent discrimination regardless of set size". Infancy. 18 (6): 1–15. doi:10.1111/infa.12008. PMC 3864890. PMID 24353478.
- Drucker, C.; Brannon, E. M. (2014). "Rhesus monkeys (Macaca mulatta) map number onto space". Cognition. 132 (1): 57–67. doi:10.1016/j.cognition.2014.03.011. PMC 4031030. PMID 24762923..
- Park, J.; Brannon, E. M. (2014). "Improving arithmetic performance with number sense training: An investigation of underlying mechanism". Cognition. 133 (1): 188–200. doi:10.1016/j.cognition.2014.06.011. PMC 4145063. PMID 25044247.
- Pinhas, M.; Woldorff, M.; Brannon, E.M. (2014). "Electrophysiological evidence for the involvement of the approximate number system in preschoolers' processing of spoken number words". Journal of Cognitive Neuroscience. 26 (9): 1891–1904. doi:10.1162/jocn_a_00631. PMC 4228473. PMID 24702455.
- DeWind, N.K.; Adams, G.K.; Platt, E. M.; Brannon, M.L. (2015). "Modeling the approximate number system; Quantifying the contribution of visual stimulus features". Cognition. 142: 247–265. doi:10.1016/j.cognition.2015.05.016. PMC 4831213. PMID 26056747.
