= Cynthia Cooper (accountant) =

American Author, Speaker, Consultant

Cynthia Cooper is an American accountant who formerly served as the Vice President of Internal Audit at WorldCom. In 2002, Cooper and her team of auditors worked together in secret and often at night to investigate and unearth $3.8 billion in fraud at WorldCom which, at that time, was the largest corporate fraud in U.S. history.

Cooper was named one of three "People of the Year" by Time magazine in 2002.

== Education ==
Cooper earned her Bachelor of Science in Accounting from Mississippi State University and a Master of Science in Accountancy from the University of Alabama. She is a Certified Public Accountant (CPA), Certified Information System Auditor (CISA), Certified Internal Auditor (CIA) and Certified Fraud Examiner (CFE).

== Career ==
Cooper worked for the Atlanta offices of public accounting firms PricewaterhouseCoopers and Deloitte & Touche, and later became Vice President of Internal Audit at Worldcom.

Cooper stayed with MCI (previously Worldcom) for two years following the fraud. She and her team helped the company successfully emerge from bankruptcy.

=== Later career ===
Since leaving what became MCI, Cooper started her own consulting firm to speak with both professionals and students sharing her experiences and lessons learned.

=== Writing ===
Cooper's book about her life and the WorldCom fraud, Extraordinary Circumstances: The Journey of a Corporate Whistleblower, was published in 2008. She has donated profits from her book to high schools and universities for ethics education.

== Personal life ==
Cooper maintains an office in Brandon, Mississippi. She married Lance Cooper in 1993; they have two children.

== Honors ==
Cooper was named one of three "People of the Year" by Time magazine in 2002, along with fellow whistleblowers Sherron Watkins and Coleen Rowley.
