= Coleen Rowley =

American FBI agent and whistleblower (born 1954)

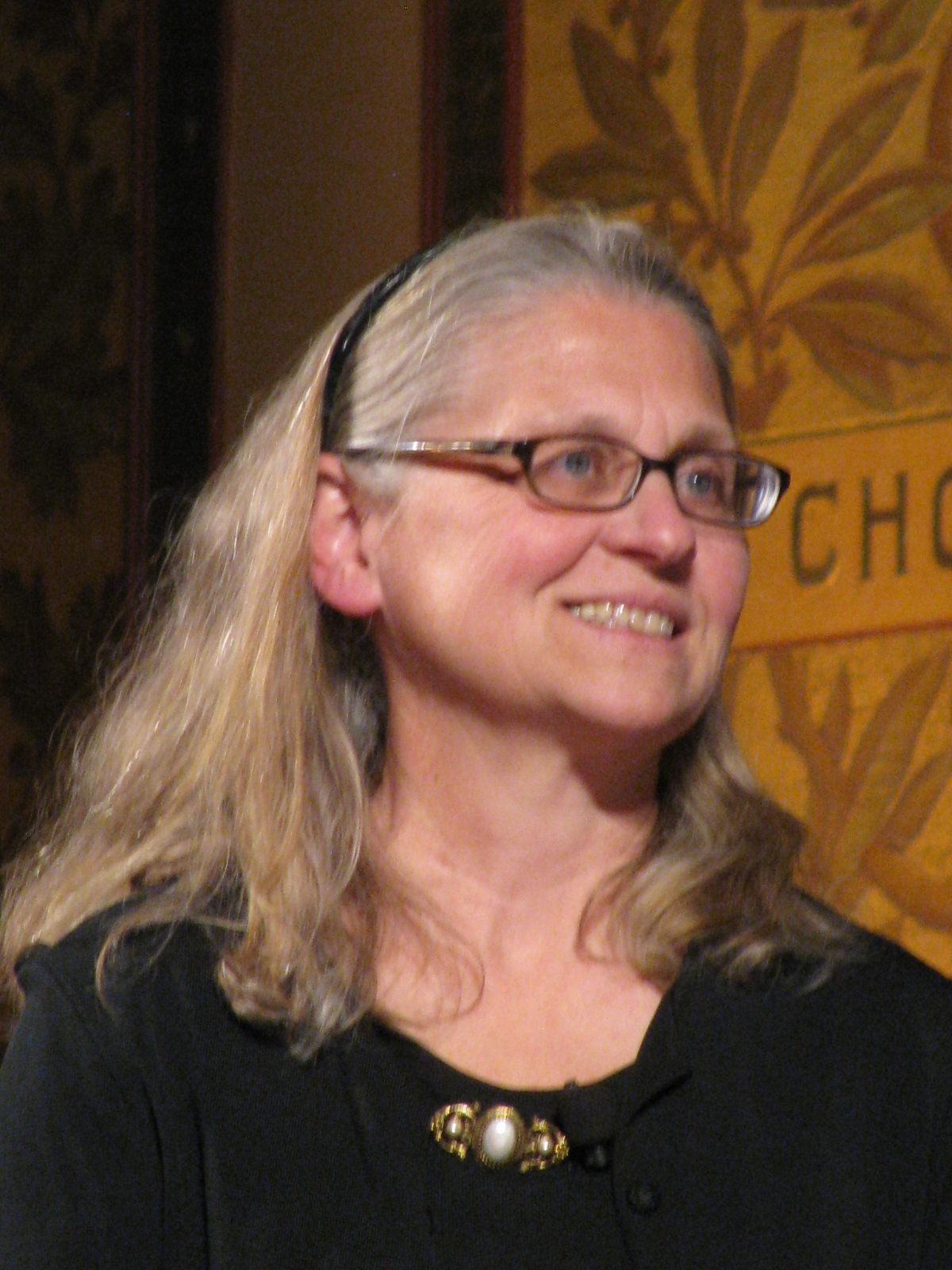
- At Georgetown University, 2014
- Born: December 20, 1954 (age 71); Fort Belvoir, Virginia, United States
- Occupations: Political activist, retired FBI special agent
- Years active: 2006–present
- Political party: Minnesota Democratic-Farmer-Labor Party
- Spouse: Ross Rowley
- Children: 4

Coleen Rowley (born December 20, 1954) is an American former FBI special agent and whistleblower. Rowley is well known for testifying as to concerns regarding the FBI ignoring information of a suspected terrorist during 9/11, which led to a two-year investigation by the Department of Justice.

Rowley was also a Democratic-Farmer-Labor Party (DFL) candidate for Congress in Minnesota's 2nd congressional district, one of eight congressional districts in Minnesota in 2006. She lost the general election to Republican incumbent John Kline. As of 2024, she is a member of Veteran Intelligence Professionals for Sanity.

== Early life and education ==
Rowley grew up in New Hampton, Iowa, and graduated valedictorian of her high school class in 1973. Her father was a letter carrier for 31 years. She received her B.A. degree in French and with honors from Wartburg College in Waverly, Iowa, in 1977. In 1980, she received her J.D. degree from the University of Iowa College of Law and passed the Iowa bar exam that summer.

== Career ==
=== FBI ===
In January 1981, Rowley became a special agent with the FBI and was assigned to the Omaha, Nebraska, and Jackson, Mississippi, divisions. Beginning in 1984, she spent six years working in the New York City field office on investigations involving Italian organized crime and Sicilian heroin. During this time she served three temporary assignments in the U.S. embassy in Paris and the consulate in Montreal. In 1990, she was transferred to the FBI's Minneapolis field office, where she became chief division counsel. There she taught constitutional law to FBI agents and police officers, and oversaw the Freedom of Information, Asset Forfeiture Program, Victim-Witness and community outreach programs.

After the September 11 attacks in 2001, Rowley wrote a paper for FBI Director Robert Mueller documenting how FBI HQ personnel in Washington, D.C., had mishandled and failed to take action on information provided by the Minneapolis, Minnesota, Field Office regarding its investigation of suspected terrorist Zacarias Moussaoui. Moussaoui had been suspected of being involved in preparations for a suicide-hijacking similar to the December 1994 "Eiffel Tower" hijacking of Air France 8969. Failures identified by Rowley may have left the U.S. vulnerable to the September 11, 2001, attacks. Rowley was one of many agents frustrated by the events that led up to the attacks, writing:

During the early aftermath of September 11th, when I happened to be recounting the pre–September 11th events concerning the Moussaoui investigation to other FBI personnel in other divisions or in FBIHQ, almost everyone's first question was "Why?—Why would an FBI agent(s) deliberately sabotage a case?" (I know I shouldn't be flippant about this, but jokes were actually made that the key FBI HQ personnel had to be spies or moles like Robert Hanssen who were actually working for Osama Bin Laden to have so undercut Minneapolis's effort.)

In May 2002 Rowley testified to the Senate and the 9/11 Commission about the FBI's pre-9/11 lapses due to its internal organization and mishandling of information related to the attacks. "We have got to call America's attention to this in order to stop the continuation of errors", Rowley stated. Mueller and Senator Chuck Grassley (R-IA) pushed for and achieved a major reorganization, focused on creation of the new Office of Intelligence at the FBI. This reorganization was supported with a significant expansion of FBI personnel with counterterrorism and language skills.

In February 2003, Rowley wrote a second open letter to Mueller, in which she warned her superiors that the bureau would not "be able to stem the flood of terrorism that will likely head our way in the wake of an attack on Iraq". In April 2003, Rowley stepped down from her legal position to return to being an FBI special agent. At the end of 2004 she retired from the FBI after serving for 24 years.

==== Recognition ====
In 2002, Rowley was named as Time magazine's Person of the Year along with two other women also credited as whistleblowers: Sherron Watkins from Enron and Cynthia Cooper of WorldCom. Rowley also received the 2002 Sam Adams Award, the first person ever to receive that award.

=== Political ===
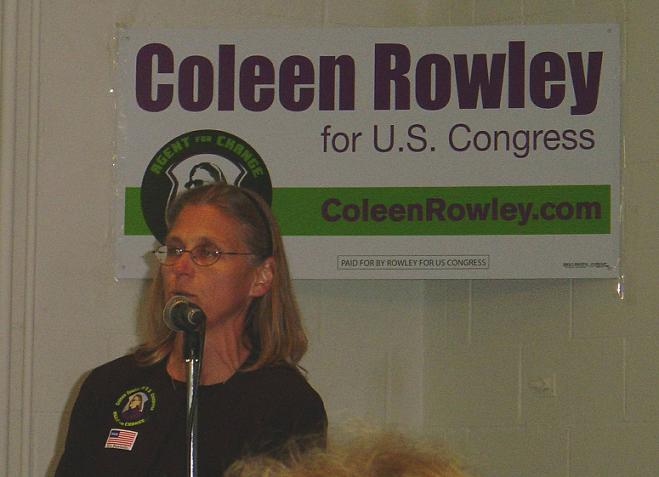
Coleen Rowley at her rally in Rosemount, Minnesota, on September 17, 2006

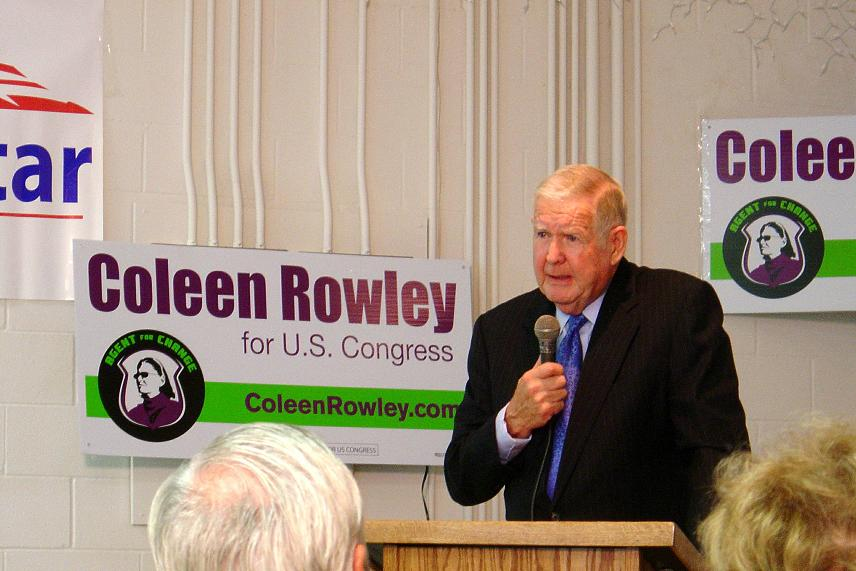
US Rep. John Murtha (D-PA) endorsing Rowley at a rally in Rosemount, Minnesota on September 17, 2006

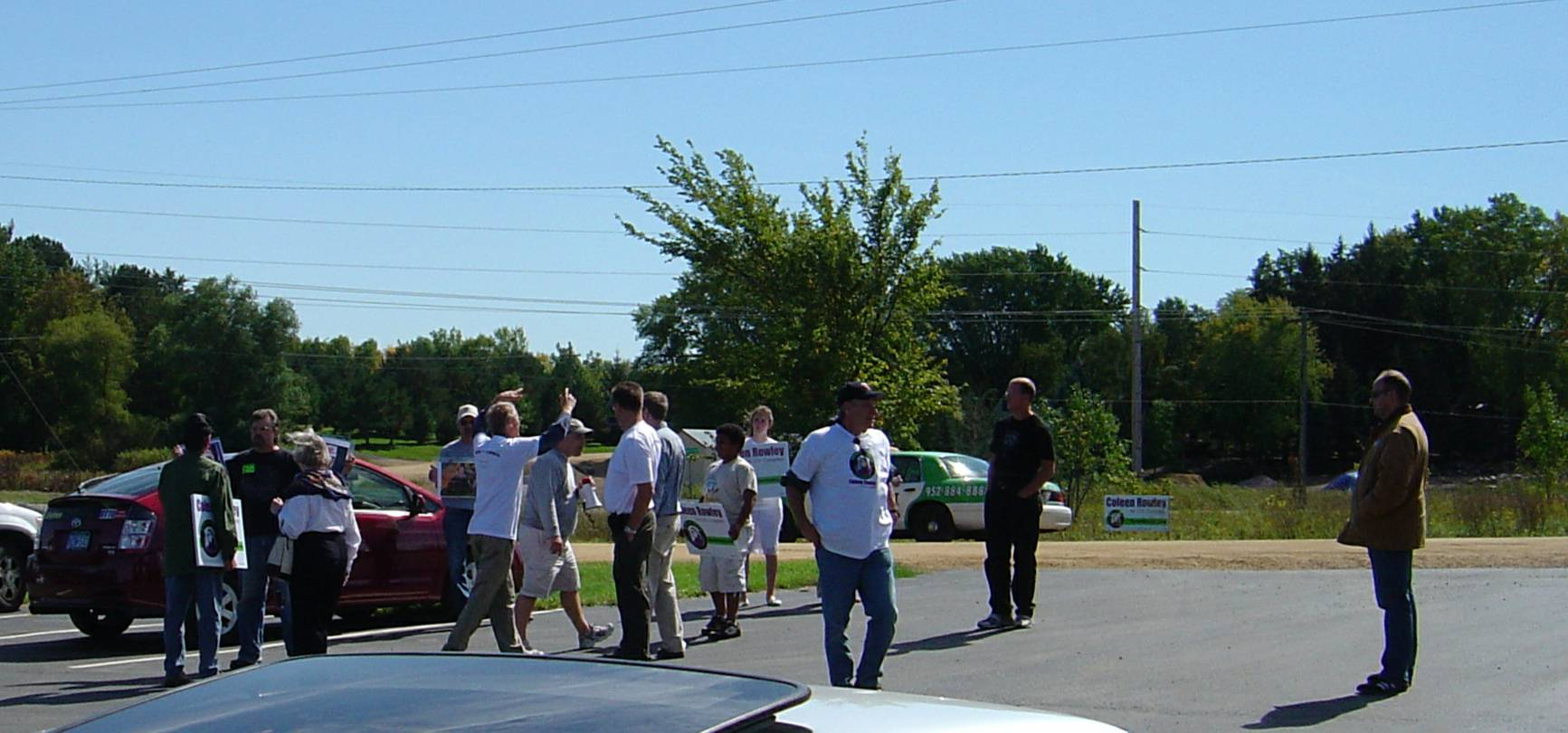
Protestors at her rally in Rosemount, Minnesota, on September 17, 2006

In May 2005, Rowley announced that she was considering running against incumbent Representative John Kline for Minnesota's 2nd District seat in the United States House of Representatives in 2006. At the time of her announcement, she had been living in Apple Valley, Minnesota, for 15 years. Rowley had formerly voted and identified as a Republican, but on June 27, 2005, she announced that she was entering the race as a DFLer, and on July 6 officially kicked off her campaign at her home.

On August 18, 2005, Rowley attended a vigil in Crawford, Texas, outside President George W. Bush's ranch requesting that the president meet with Cindy Sheehan to answer Sheehan's questions about the War in Iraq and the death of Sheehan's son, Casey.

On January 3, 2006, an unauthorized professionally retouched image appeared on Rowley's campaign website. This image depicted Kline, a retired Marine Corps colonel, as Colonel Klink from Hogan's Heroes. Kline objected to the photo, and the Rowley campaign removed the image the same day and initiated an investigation. Rowley apologized quickly.

Representative John Murtha (D-PA) endorsed Rowley. He visited the district during the campaign and held a rally for Rowley at the local VFW in Rosemount, while veterans protested outside. The Rowley campaign subsequently focused efforts on veterans' groups and others with direct experience of the war in Iraq. Financing her campaign proved difficult. Opposing an incumbent conservative such as Kline in a conservative district did not attract money from the most robust Democratic resources, such as the DNC.

Kline's campaign achieved a 2–1 advantage in raising funds, and he easily retained his seat.

=== Civil liberties and peace activism ===
Since 2003 Rowley has spoken publicly on ethics and ethical decision-making to various groups. She is a writer and blogger. She joined other whistleblowers on the June 2015 speaking tour "Stand Up for Truth" which went through London, Oslo, Stockholm and Berlin. She returned to lecture at her alma mater three times, in 2003, 2004 and 2015.

== Personal life ==
Rowley is married and has four children. During her time in the FBI she was "the sole breadwinner of a family of six".

== Bibliography ==
Rowley authored a chapter in Patriotism, Democracy, and Common Sense: Restoring America's Promise at Home and Abroad. edited by Alan Cutis and Kevin Phillip (Rowman & Littlefield Publishers, 2005, 496 pages, ISBN 0742542173).

She has been a regular contributor at The Huffington Post since January 2006 and Rowley has written for The Guardian.

== See also ==
- The Shadow Factory
- Robert Wright Jr.
- Sibel Edmonds
- Frederic Whitehurst
- List of peace activists
