= Shanya Gill =

American entrepreneur

- Occupations: Entrepreneur, inventor
- Known for: Thermal-imaging fire-detection device; founder of Vigil Inc.
- Awards: ASCEND Award (2023); Time Kid of the Year honoree (2024)

Shanya Gill is an American entrepreneur and inventor. She was named to the 2024 Kid of the Year list by Time for developing a fire-detection device based on thermal imaging.

== Fire-detection device ==
Gill developed a prototype that used a thermal imaging camera connected to a Raspberry Pi computer. The software, written in Python, distinguishes between moving warm objects, such as people, and stationary heat sources, such as an active gas burner. The system was designed to send a text message when it detected an unattended heat source. In an interview with Entrepreneur, Gill said the idea for the device came after a fire at a restaurant in her San Jose neighborhood.

The Society for Science tested the device and reported detection rates of 98 percent for human presence and 97 percent for heat sources, as well as a 97 percent rate for sending alerts when a heat source was left unattended.

In 2023, The Washington Post reported on the device development and included comments from Yogesh Jaluria, a Rutgers University professor, who discussed its potential and the possibility of false alarms.

Gill received the ASCEND Award at the 2023 Thermo Fisher Scientific Junior Innovators Challenge, organized by the Society for Science, earning a prize of $25,000.

In March 2024, Gill met with U.S. Fire Administration Administrator Lori Moore-Merrell to discuss the device and its potential wider use. Time reported that the agency was helping her explore funding for further development and distribution.

In August 2024, Time included Gill among five honorees on its Kid of the Year list.

A January 2025 article in Scholastic News described the device and Gill's plans to make it available to the public.

== Vigil Inc. ==
Gill founded Vigil Inc. in 2025 to develop monitoring technology. In Oct 2025, Entrepreneur reported that the company is developing a system using cameras to provide alerts about events detected by the device.

In May 2026, Fierce Sensors published an interview with Gill about Vigil's development and its use of artificial intelligence and sensors. It also covered Gill's appearance at Sensors Converge 2026.
