= Jessica F. Cantlon =

American scientist

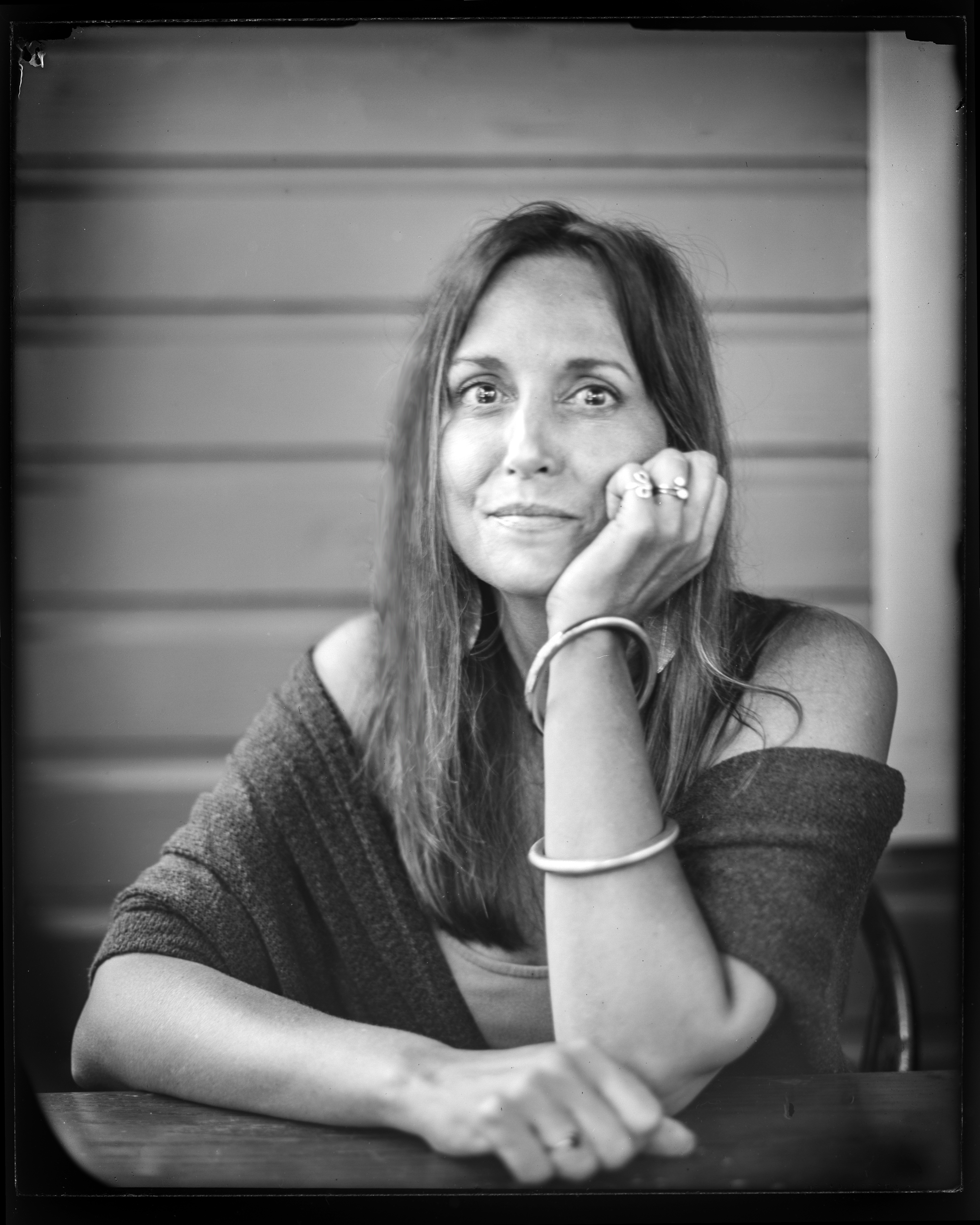
- Education: Duke University (PhD); Indiana University Bloomington (BSc)
- Scientific career
- Workplaces: Carnegie Mellon University
- Thesis: The cognitive and neural roots of mathematical knowledge. (2007)
- Doctoral advisor: Elizabeth M. Brannon

Jessica Cantlon is the Ronald J. and Mary Ann Zdrojkowski Professor of Developmental Neuroscience at the Carnegie Mellon University. In 2017 she was selected as Time Person of the Year as one of the Silence Breakers.

== Early life and education ==
Cantlon studied anthropology at Indiana University Bloomington. She moved to Duke University for her graduate studies, where she worked with Elizabeth Brannon on the neural bases of mathematical knowledge. Early in her graduate studies, Cantlon trained herself in functional MRI, recognising that neuroimaging could be used to further our understanding of learning. Her research involved investigations into the origin of the human and primate capacity for mathematics. Cantlon showed that monkeys can perform mental arithmetic. Working with Brannon, Cantlon constructed a mathematical task that asked monkeys to deduce whether a series of numbers were larger or smaller than the ones that proceeded them. This study showed that the mechanism that monkeys use to make comparisons are the same as the ones humans use. To prove the numerical skills of monkeys, Cantlon constructed an experiment where macaques interacted with a touchscreen computer that displayed basic mathematical challenges. Cantlon presented the same challenges to college students, who achieved 94% correct answers, whilst the monkeys were successful 76% of the time. The monkeys and college students had the same reaction time. She completed her doctorate in 2007.

== Research and career ==
Cantlon joined the University of Rochester as an Assistant Professor in 2009. Here she studied the innate ability of humans to recognise and understand numbers. Whilst the capacity for complicated symbolic mathematics appears to be unique to humans, it is not clear where this numerical prowess emerges from. She combines psychological investigations with Magnetic Resonance Imaging (MRI) and Positron Emission Tomography (PET) to understand mathematical intuition. She continued to study the mathematical abilities of monkeys, showing that even young baboons can differentiate between large and small numbers.

In 2017, Cantlon was one of several whistleblowers who sued the University of Rochester for its handling of sexual harassment complaints. Cantlon and another whistleblower Celeste Kidd were named as two of Time's Person of the Year 2017 for their complaints. Later that year Cantlon left her position at the University of Rochester alleging that they failed to act while the investigation was proceeding and took up a position at Carnegie Mellon. Ultimately, in 2020, Cantlon and the other plaintiffs settled with the University or Rochester for $9.4 million.

In 2018 Cantlon was made the Zdrojkowski Chair in Developmental Neuroscience at Carnegie Mellon University. Using MRI, Cantlon studied activity in the intraparietal sulcus of young people during numerical tasks. She demonstrated that boys and girls have identical capabilities.

== Awards and honours ==
- 2016 Science News 10 Scientists to Watch
- 2017 Time Person of the Year

== Selected publications ==
- Jessica F Cantlon; Elizabeth M Brannon; Elizabeth J Carter; Kevin A Pelphrey (11 April 2006). "Functional imaging of numerical processing in adults and 4-y-old children". PLOS Biology. 4 (5): e125. doi:10.1371/journal.pbio.0040125. ISSN 1544-9173. PMC 1431577. PMID 16594732. S2CID 8927879. Wikidata Q21092777.
- Chapter 7: Number Beyond Number. 31 December 2011. pp. 93–110. doi:10.1515/9783110319750.93. ISBN 978-3-110-31975-0. Wikidata Q116267808.
- Jessica F Cantlon; Elizabeth M Brannon (1 May 2006). "Shared system for ordering small and large numbers in monkeys and humans". Psychological Science. 17 (5): 401–406. doi:10.1111/j.1467-9280.2006.01719.x. ISSN 0956-7976. PMID 16683927. S2CID 1781257. Wikidata Q48447688.

== Personal life ==
Cantlon is married to Brad Mahon, a cognitive neuroscientist at Carnegie Mellon University.

Cantlon's 9th great grandmother is Rebecca Nurse.
