= Philip H. Hilder =

American criminal defense lawyer

- Born: Philip Harlan Hilder; July 2, 1955 (age 70); Highland Park, Illinois, U.S.
- Education: University of Iowa (BA); Boston College (JD)
- Occupation: Lawyer
- Political party: Democratic
- Spouse: Maura O'Dowd

Philip Harlan Hilder (born July 2, 1955) is an American criminal defense lawyer and founder of the Houston law firm Hilder & Associates, P.C.

== Legal career ==
He has represented whistle-blowers and other witnesses and defendants in several high-profile white-collar crime cases. He represented Sherron Watkins, the former Enron vice president who helped shed light on details of the company's collapse in 2001. Ms. Watkins was named one of Time magazine's three "Persons of the Year 2002." Hilder was interviewed and featured in the 2005 Oscar-nominated Alex Gibney documentary, Enron: The Smartest Guys in the Room.

In the lobbying scandal surrounding Jack Abramoff, Hilder represented Tom Rodgers, a Washington lobbyist for Indian tribes who leaked documents to the media about Abramoff's activities.

Hilder represented the first whistle-blower in the Countrywide Financial scandal of 2008. Another Hilder client was the whistle-blower who was sued by his former employer News America Marketing when he testified about the company's anticompetitive practices. News America is a marketing subsidiary of News Corp.

Hilder and associate James Rytting also have worked with The Innocence Project and represented Texas death row inmate Larry Swearingen. Swearingen had long insisted he was innocent and his execution was stayed in 2013 through the efforts of Hilder and Rytting while he sought DNA testing of crime scene evidence. He was ultimately executed on August 21, 2019. Before entering private law practice, Hilder was the attorney-in-charge of the Justice Department's Houston office of the Organized Crime Strike Force. He was also an assistant U.S. attorney in the Southern District of Texas with the Presidential Organized Crime Drug Enforcement Task Force.

== Education ==
Hilder holds a J.D. degree from Boston College Law School (J.D. 1981) and undergraduate degree from the University of Iowa (B.A. 1977).

== Politics ==
He volunteered, supported and served on the presidential campaigns of Ted Kennedy, Walter Mondale, and Barack Obama.

== Personal life ==
He is married to Maura O’Dowd of Ballymote, Ireland. He has six children: Eliot, Sydney, Lauren, Jordan, Ronnald, and Quentin.

== Film ==
• Enron: The Smartest Guys in the Room 2005. IMDB. Includes personal interviews with Philip Hilder.
