= Orion Jean =

Haitian-American author

Orion Jean is a Haitian American author and philanthropist who was named Time Kid of the Year.

== Awards and honors ==
- Time Kid of the Year in 2021
- Was in cover of Time on February 28, 2022
- Top 10 Youth Volunteers of 2021 by Prudential Spirit of Community Award
- Gloria Barron Prize for Young Heroes in 2022

== Missions ==
He is the founder of Race to Kindness program in which he donates meals, books and toys to children. In 2021 he donated 100,000 meals on a mission to spread kindness. In 2020, he donated more than 600 toys to Children's Hospital in North Texas. In 2021, he collected more than 500,000 books for the kids in need in which ThriftBooks also supported him.
