= Sherron Watkins =

American businesswoman and whistleblower

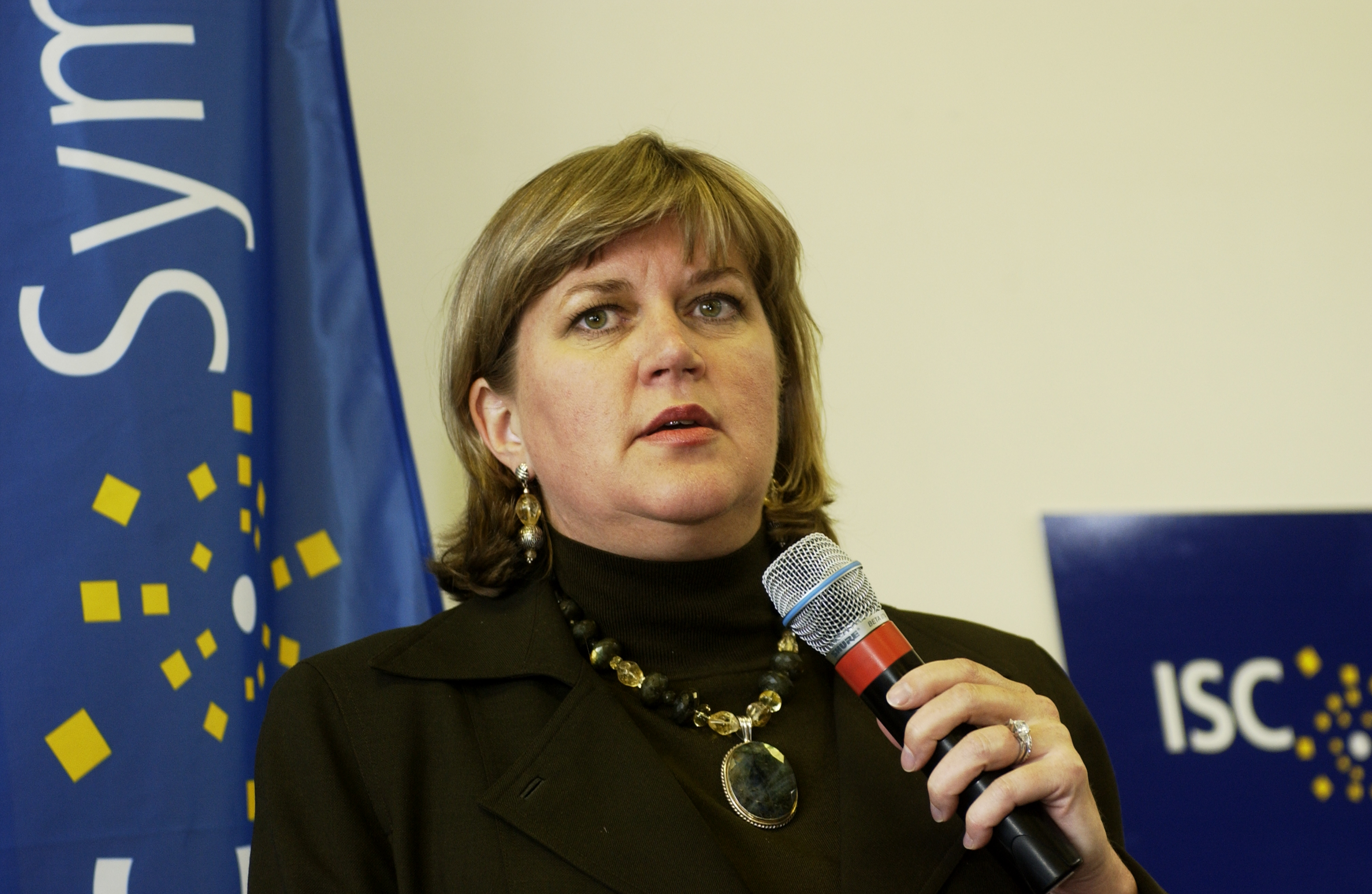
- Sherron Watkins in 2004
- Born: August 28, 1959 (age 66); Tomball, Texas, U.S.
- Education: University of Texas (BBA)
- Occupation(s): Accountant, businessperson
- Awards: Time Person of the Year

Sherron Watkins (born August 28, 1959) is an American former Vice President of Corporate Development at the Enron Corporation. Watkins discovered and reported the 2001 Enron scandal to Enron's then-CEO Kenneth Lay.

Watkins was selected as one of three "Persons of the Year 2002" by Time magazine, alongside two other whistleblowers, Cynthia Cooper of WorldCom and Coleen Rowley of the FBI.

== Early life and education ==
Watkins was born in Tomball, Texas. Watkins holds a Bachelor of Business Administration (with honors) from the University of Texas, where she was a member of Alpha Chi Omega sorority and a Master in Professional Accounting, also from the McCombs School of Business. Watkins is a Certified Public Accountant with retired status.

== Career ==
Watkins began her career in 1982 at Arthur Andersen as an auditor. She spent eight years at Andersen in both the Houston and New York offices. She joined New York-based MG Trade Finance in 1990 to manage their portfolio of commodity-backed finance assets until October 1993. She joined Enron in 1993.

In August 2001, Watkins alerted Lay of accounting irregularities in financial reports. According to The Guardian: "Enron began an inquiry, but it failed to use independent investigators and her claims were largely dismissed." Watkins was later criticized for not reporting the fraud to government authorities and not speaking up publicly sooner about her concerns, as her memo did not reach the public until five months after it was written. Watkins was represented by Houston attorney Philip H. Hilder.

Watkins was called to testify before committees of the U.S. House of Representatives and Senate at the beginning of 2002, primarily about her warnings to Enron's then-CEO Kenneth Lay about accounting irregularities in the financial statements.

In 2004, Watkins released a book about her experiences at Enron and the problems of US corporate culture, Power Failure: The Inside Story of the Collapse of Enron.

== Books ==
- Mimi Swartz with Sherron Watkins: Power Failure. The Inside Story of The Collapse of Enron, ISBN 0-385-50787-9 (March 2003)

== Film ==
- Enron: The Smartest Guys in the Room. 2005. IMDB Includes personal interviews with Sherron Watkins.
- The Crooked E: The Unshredded Truth About Enron. 2003. Portrayed as a staff accountant who nervously alerts Lay of the misstatements.
