= Tom Rodgers =

Native American activist and organizer

Tom Rodgers (born July 28, 1960) is a Native American activist and advocate for tribal issues. Based in Washington, D.C., Rodgers is an enrolled member of the Blackfeet Nation in Montana, where translated from the Siksiká language he is called "One who Rides his Horse East." In 1994, Rodgers founded Carlyle Consulting, a governmental/media/public strategies firm located in Alexandria, Virginia that represents the interests of Native Americans. He was included on Politico's 2023 Recast Power List of 40 most powerful people on race and politics.

Emerging as a potent voice for Indigenous Americans in 2002, Rodgers played a key role in the investigation that led to the conviction of former lobbyist Jack Abramoff, who bilked millions of dollars from tribal partners. Since then, Rodgers has waged a Native American Voting Rights effort to help provide Native Americans on remote, poverty-stricken reservations with equal access to voting, and has worked to educate Congress, the public and media about the dark tragedy of Missing and Murdered Indigenous Women and Girls in the U.S. and Canada. More recently, Rodgers joined in the effort to get Yellowstone National Park to rename a mountain First People's Mountain to honor slaughtered Native Americans by removing the name of U.S. Army captain who massacred them.

Rodgers is also considered one of the leading advocates in Washington and the indigenous communities for cannabis reform with a focus on opportunity and equity, and opening up legal access to plant medicines with mindful respect for traditional Native American healing practices. A strong supporter of repatriation of indigenous remains, Rodgers is currently engaged in an effort to return to his native land the remains and spirit of legendary athlete Jim Thorpe.

== Early life and education ==
Rodgers was born and raised on the Great Plains near Glasgow, Montana, considered to be the most isolated community in the U.S. and located in "the middle of nowhere." Rodgers obtained a Bachelor of Arts in Political Science and Economics, J.D. and L.L.M in Taxation at the University of Denver. He went on to obtain a Masters in International Public Policy with an emphasis in China Studies at the Johns Hopkins School of Advanced International Studies. He also attended the Georgetown University McDonough School of Business Executive MBA program. Rodgers commitment to education includes regularly speaking before high school and college students.

== Advocacy and representation ==
From 1990 to 1993, Rodgers served as tax legislative counsel to Senate Finance Committee Chairman Max Baucus. Before that, he served as tax counsel to United States Tax Court Judge Marvin F. Peterson. Rodgers went on to form Carlyle Consulting. He has written about persistent poverty and high unemployment in Native American communities. Rodgers established a scholarship at his alma mater, the University of Denver Sturm College of Law, named the Tom C. Rodgers O-tee-paym-soo-wuk Ethics in Government Scholarship, to benefit Native American law students, “O-tee-paym-soo-wuk” means “a man who owns himself” in the Cree language. The purpose of the scholarship is to develop the legal and advocacy skills necessary to participate in the debate surrounding public policy and its creation, using ethics as their guiding value. The total scholarship value is around $160,000 over three years. Rodgers has raised more than $1.2 million in charity for Native American youth, tribal governments, Native American financial literacy programs, and Native American voting rights efforts. He is also leading an ongoing effort to educate people about the impact the opioid crisis has had on Native American tribes and nations, working on behalf of a federal class action lawsuits against opioid manufacturers and distributors.

== Native American Voter Suppression ==
Rodgers has described the effort to suppress the Native American vote "the Jim Crow of the West," and Rodgers played a vital role in an historic Native American voter registration and turnout effort in the 2016 and 2020 elections. Using the courts and legislative process and partnering with voter access organizations and activists, Rodgers efforts for more than a decade have helped move a combination of voter registration offices, voting booths and ballot drop boxes to remote Native American reservations in Western States, including Arizona, Montana and Nevada.

Attorney General Eric Holder in June 2014 stated that the Montana native voting rights "conditions are unacceptable and they are outrageous......As a nation, we cannot—and we will not—simply stand by as the voices of Native Americans are shut out of the democratic process." Since then, Indigenous voting rights litigation pursued by Rodgers and allies drew the support of Department of Justice Civil Rights Division, as well as the American Civil Liberties Union and National Congress of American Indians.

In May 2015, U.S. Attorney General Loretta Lynch, a stalwart proponent of expanding voter access for Native Americans, transmitted to Vice President Joe Biden and Speaker of the House John Boehner a request in statutory form that the outcome sought in the Wandering Medicine voter access litigation should be enacted into federal law. This was soon followed by introduction of legislation by Sens. Jon Tester, Heidi Heitkamp, Tom Udall, and Al Franken. The federal action elevated the significance of the Wandering Medicine litigation in the Native Americans empowerment and enfranchisement movement, dating back to the Indian Citizenship Act of 1924. In the spring of 2018, Tester broadened the Native American voter access fight, demanding Attorney General Jeff Sessions and Director Tracy Toulou of the Office of Tribal Justice establish satellite voting locations on tribal lands.

Building off the voter project, in the fall of 2016 Rodgers joined a national legal advocacy effort on behalf of the Standing Rock Sioux, working to educate lawmakers and officials in Washington, D.C., and nationwide to the need to protect the water supply for the tribe and all downstream residents in the upper Missouri River region from the Dakota Access Pipeline.

== Jack Abramoff whistleblower ==
After years of advocating for "Indian Country", Rodgers was approached in early 2002 by tribal leaders from The Coushatta Tribe of Louisiana and The Saginaw Chippewa of Michigan to discuss threats that had been made to them by their lobbyist Jack Abramoff. They expressed concern as to the services they were receiving in exchange for the large amount being charged.

Rodgers worked with the tribal members to gather internal invoices and documents, and leak the documents to reporters. They were instrumental in exposing Abramoff's criminal activities, which subsequently led to the arrest of former Rep. Bob Ney (R-Ohio), helping to force then-Majority Leader Tom DeLay (R-Texas) from office. During this time, Rodgers was represented by whistle-blowers' advocate, Houston attorney Philip H. Hilder. In the aftermath, Congress passed the most sweeping new ethics rules since Watergate.

Rodgers has continued to track Abramoff to criticize his reform claims, to question the intentions of organizations that have shown support for Abramoff’s recent reform efforts, and the extent to which Abramoff’s influence reached into the media. Rodgers appeared in the documentary, ‘’Casino Jack and the United States of Money’’, by Alex Gibney about the career and corruption scandal surrounding Jack Abramoff. He received an ethics award from the University of Denver for his role in bringing to light Abramoff’s criminal actions.

Rodgers has been interviewed on the Abramoff case, as well as on Native American rights, for media outlets, including The New York Times, The Washington Post, The Guardian, USA Today, The Hill, The Huffington Post, BBC, The Nation, CNN, Fox News, MSNBC, The Last Word with Lawrence O'Donnell, The Atlantic, Roll Call, Financial Times, Bloomberg News, Talking Points Memo, Washingtonian, Indian Country Today, Democracy NOW, and the National Press Club newsmakers series.
