= Celeste Kidd =

American psychologist and researcher

- Education: University of Rochester; University of Southern California
- Scientific career
- Workplaces: University of California, Berkeley; MIT; Stanford University
- Thesis: Rational Approaches to Learning and Development
- Doctoral advisor: Richard N. Aslin
- Website: www.kiddlab.com

Celeste Kidd is a professor of psychology at the University of California, Berkeley. She was amongst the "Silence Breakers" who were named Time Person of the Year in 2017.

== Early life and education ==
Kidd studied print journalism and linguistics at the University of Southern California, where she earned a dual honors degree in 2007. Kidd moved to the University of Rochester for her graduate studies, where she worked in brain and cognitive studies and earned her PhD in 2013. She worked with Richard N. Aslin, an expert on infant learning. Kidd held visiting positions at Stanford University and the Massachusetts Institute of Technology.

== Research and career ==
Kidd works on curiosity and exploration throughout early development. She was hired as assistant professor at the University of Rochester in 2012. She has studied the willpower of children, challenging the Stanford marshmallow experiment. She demonstrated that children's willpower is influenced by their superior's reliability and trust.

Kidd was made director of the Rochester Baby Lab at the University of Rochester in 2014.

In 2017, Kidd was one of several whistleblowers who sued the University of Rochester for its handling of sexual harassment complaints. Kidd and another whistleblower Jessica F. Cantlon were named as two of Time's Person of the Year 2017 for their complaints. Ultimately, in 2020, Kidd and the other plaintiffs settled with the University or Rochester for $9.4 million.

She resigned from University of Rochester and moved to the University of California, Berkeley in June 2018. She has studied why it is so difficult to shake a false belief, such as believing in flat earth or climate change denial. Kidd is interested in the neuroscience of curiosity. She demonstrated that uncertainty can lead to the most curiosity.

== Awards and honors ==
- 2012 Discover magazine Top 100 Science Story of 2012
- 2014 Cognitive Science Society Glushko Dissertation Prize in Cognitive Science
- 2017 Time Person of the Year

Kidd has been selected as one of the Association for Psychological Science's Rising Stars.
