= Time Person of the Year =

Annual influential person or idea chosen by magazine

Person of the Year
- Country: United States
- Presented by: Time
- Formerly called: Man of the Year; Woman of the Year
- First award: 1927; 99 years ago
- Currently held by: "The Architects of AI" (2025)
- Website: https://www.time.com/poy

Person of the Year, called Man of the Year or Woman of the Year until 1999, is an annual issue of the American news magazine and website Time featuring a person, group, idea, or object that "for better or for worse ... has done the most to influence the events of the year". The Time website or a partner organization also runs an annual online reader's poll that has no effect on the selection, although no poll was held in 2023 or 2024.

== Background ==
The tradition of selecting a "Man of the Year" began privately in 1927, with Time editors contemplating the news makers of the year after a series of "slow news days" leading up to New Year's Day. The idea originally focused on a Man of the Week before it was decided to use Charles Lindbergh to represent the predominant story of 1927, with the magazine listing him as Man of the Year being published in early 1928. The idea was also an attempt to remedy the editorial embarrassment earlier that year of not having aviator Lindbergh on its cover following his historic transatlantic flight. By the end of the year, it was decided that a cover story featuring Lindbergh as the Man of the Year would serve both purposes. Before the online poll was instituted, "readers were invited to weigh in by mail."

== Selection ==
=== State leaders ===
Since the list began, every serving president of the United States has been a Man or Person of the Year at least once, with the exceptions of Calvin Coolidge (whose last term began before the first issue), Herbert Hoover (the subsequent president), and Gerald Ford (the only president never to have been elected to the office of president or vice president). Most were named Man or Person of the Year either the year they were elected or while they were in office; the only one to be given the title before being elected was Dwight D. Eisenhower, in 1944, as Supreme Commander of the Allied Invasion Force, eight years before his first election. He received the title again in 1959 while in office. Franklin D. Roosevelt became the first chosen US president and is the only person to have received the title three times, first as president-elect (1932) and later as the incumbent president (1934 and 1941). Below is a list of all countries' heads of state or government to have been chosen as Man, Woman, or Person of the Year (arranged in chronological order by country name, from the most frequently selected).

Number of selections	Office	Name
24 (14 unique leaders)	President of the United States	Franklin D. Roosevelt (1932, 1934, 1941); Harry S. Truman (1945, 1948); Dwight D. Eisenhower (1959); John F. Kennedy (1961); Lyndon B. Johnson (1964, 1967); Richard Nixon (1971, 1972); Jimmy Carter (1976); Ronald Reagan (1980, 1983); George H. W. Bush (1990); Bill Clinton (1992, 1998); George W. Bush (2000, 2004); Barack Obama (2008, 2012); Joe Biden (2020); and Donald Trump (2016, 2024)
6 (4 unique leaders)	General Secretary of the Communist Party of the Soviet Union	Joseph Stalin (1939, 1942); Nikita Khrushchev (1957); Yuri Andropov (1983); and Mikhail Gorbachev (1987, 1989)
4	Chancellor of Germany	Adolf Hitler (1938); Konrad Adenauer (1953); Willy Brandt (1970); and Angela Merkel (2015)
3	Pope (Sovereign leader of the Vatican City)	John XXIII (1962); John Paul II (1994); and Francis (2013)
2 (1 unique leader)	Paramount leader of the People's Republic of China	Deng Xiaoping (1978, 1985)
2	Prime Minister of France	Pierre Laval (1931); and Charles de Gaulle (1958)
1	Premier of the Republic of China	Chiang Kai-shek (1937)
1	President of Egypt	Anwar Sadat (1977)
1	Emperor of Ethiopia	Haile Selassie (1935)
1	Prime Minister of Iran	Mohammad Mosaddegh (1951)
1	Supreme Leader of Iran	Ruhollah Khomeini (1979)
1	Prime Minister of Israel	Yitzhak Rabin (1993)
1	President of the Palestinian National Authority	Yasser Arafat (1993)
1	President of the Philippines	Corazon Aquino (1986)
1	President of Russia	Vladimir Putin (2007)
1	King of Saudi Arabia	Faisal (1974)
1	State President of South Africa	F. W. de Klerk (1993)
1	President of Ukraine	Volodymyr Zelenskyy (2022)
1	Prime Minister of the United Kingdom	Winston Churchill (1940)
1	Queen of the United Kingdom and the other Commonwealth realms	Elizabeth II (1952)

Notes Winston Churchill was chosen a second time for the special "Man of the Half-Century" edition in 1949 while serving as Leader of the Opposition before his second premiership; Charles de Gaulle was chosen while being elected President of France before formally taking office; Lech Wałęsa and Nelson Mandela were chosen before being elected President of Poland and President of South Africa, respectively.

=== Women ===
Before 1999, four women were granted the title as individuals: three as "Woman of the Year"—Wallis Simpson (1936), Queen Elizabeth II (1952), and Corazon Aquino (1986)—and one as half of "Man and Wife of the Year", Soong Mei-ling (jointly with Chiang Kai-shek) in 1937. "American Women" were recognized as a group in 1975. Other classes of people recognized comprise both men and women, such as "Hungarian Freedom Fighters" (1956), "U.S. Scientists" (1960), "The Inheritors" (1966), "The Middle Americans" (1969), "The American Soldier" (1950 and 2003), "You" (2006), "The Protester" (2011), and "Ebola Fighters" (2014). However, the title on the magazine remained "Man of the Year" for both the 1956 "Hungarian Freedom Fighter" and the 1966 "Twenty-five and Under" editions which both featured a woman standing behind a man, and "Men of the Year" on the 1960 "U.S. Scientists" edition which exclusively featured men on its cover. It was not until the 1969 edition on "The Middle Americans" that the title embraced "Man and Woman of the Year".

In 1999, the title was changed to the gender-neutral "Person of the Year" (its first recipient under the new name being Jeff Bezos of Amazon.com). Women who have been selected for recognition after the renaming include "The Whistleblowers" (Cynthia Cooper, Coleen Rowley, and Sherron Watkins) in 2002; Melinda Gates (jointly with Bill Gates and Bono) in 2005; Angela Merkel (2015); "The Silence Breakers" (2017); Greta Thunberg (2019); Kamala Harris (jointly with Joe Biden) in 2020; Taylor Swift (2023); and "The Architects of AI" (among whom Fei-Fei Li and Lisa Su) in 2025. To celebrate International Women's Day in 2020, Time editors released 89 new magazine covers, each showing women, in addition to the 11 already chosen, as counterparts to the Man of the Year choices from the past century. Since 2022, Time has awarded a separate "Women of the Year" title to a number of women each year, in a similar fashion to Time 100.

=== Groups and non-humans ===
Despite the name, the title is not just granted to individuals. Pairs of people such as married couples and political opponents, classes of people, and inanimate objects have all been selected for the special year-end issue.

Multiple named people

- Chiang Kai-shek and Soong Mei-ling, president and first lady of Republic of China (1937)
- William Anders, Frank Borman and Jim Lovell, crew of Apollo 8 (1968)
- Richard Nixon and Henry Kissinger, political allies (1972)
- Ronald Reagan and Yuri Andropov, Cold War rivals (1983)
- Nelson Mandela and F. W. de Klerk; Yasser Arafat and Yitzhak Rabin, political leaders leading peace negotiations (1993)
- Bill Clinton and Ken Starr, key figures in the Clinton impeachment (1998)
- Cynthia Cooper, Coleen Rowley and Sherron Watkins, whistleblowers (2002)
- Bill Gates, Melinda Gates and Bono, philanthropists (2005)
- Joe Biden and Kamala Harris, American president-elect and vice president-elect (2020)

Classes of unnamed people

- The American fighting-man / The American soldier (1950 and 2003)
- The Hungarian freedom fighter (1956)
- U.S. scientists (1960)
- The Inheritor (1966)
- Middle Americans (1969)
- American women (1975)
- You (2006)
- The Protester (2011)
- Ebola fighters (2014)
- The Silence Breakers (2017)
- The Guardians (2018)
- The Architects of AI (2025)

Inanimate objects

- The Computer (Machine of the Year, 1982)
- The Endangered Earth (Planet of the Year, 1988)

Abstract concepts

- The Spirit of Ukraine (2022)

=== Special editions ===
In 1949, Winston Churchill was named Man of the Half-Century, and the last issue of 1989 named Mikhail Gorbachev as "Man of the Decade". The December 31, 1999 issue of Time named Albert Einstein the "Person of the Century". Both Franklin D. Roosevelt and Mahatma Gandhi were chosen as runners-up. Aside from Einstein, the December 31 edition also named Persons of the Century for every century of the 2nd millennium: William the Conqueror for the 11th century, Saladin for the 12th century, Genghis Khan for the 13th century, Giotto for the 14th century, Johannes Gutenberg for the 15th century, Elizabeth I for the 16th century, Isaac Newton for the 17th century, Thomas Jefferson for the 18th century, and Thomas Edison for the 19th century.

=== Controversial choices ===
Despite the magazine's frequent statements to the contrary, the designation is often regarded as an honor and spoken of as an award or prize, simply based on many previous selections of admirable people. Time observes that controversial figures such as Adolf Hitler (1938), Joseph Stalin (1939 and 1942), Nikita Khrushchev (1957), and Ayatollah Khomeini (1979) have also been granted the title for their impact on events. Nevertheless, as a result of the cancellation of subscriptions from the American audience for naming Khomeini Man of the Year in 1979, following the Iran hostage crisis, the magazine's editors have since shied away from using figures who are controversial in the United States, fearing reductions in sales or advertising revenue.

Time's Person of the Year for 2001, immediately following the September 11 attacks, was Rudy Giuliani, who was mayor of New York City at the time of the attacks. The stated rules of selection—the individual or group of individuals who have had the bigger influence on the year's events—made Osama bin Laden the more likely choice that year; however, Giuliani was selected for symbolizing the American response to the attacks, in the same way that Albert Einstein was selected Person of the Century for representing a century of scientific exploration and wonder instead of Adolf Hitler, who was arguably a stronger candidate.

=== Withdrawn and alleged selections ===
In 1941, the fictional elephant Dumbo from Walt Disney's animated film of the same name was selected to be "Mammal of the Year", and a cover was created showing the title character in a formal portrait style. However, the attack on Pearl Harbor on December 7 pre-empted the cover. The U.S. president Franklin Delano Roosevelt was named Man of the Year for a record third time, although Dumbo's Mammal of the Year profile still appeared on the inside pages of the magazine.

Filmmaker Michael Moore claims that director Mel Gibson cost him the opportunity to be Person of the Year alongside Gibson in 2004. Moore's controversial political documentary Fahrenheit 9/11 became the highest-grossing documentary of all time the same year Gibson's The Passion of the Christ became a box-office success and also caused significant controversy. Moore said in an interview "I got a call right after the '04 election from an editor from Time Magazine. He said,' Time Magazine has picked you and Mel Gibson to be Time's Person of the Year to put on the cover, Right and Left, Mel and Mike. The only thing you have to do is pose for a picture with each other. And do an interview together.' I said 'OK.' They call Mel up, he agrees. They set the date and time in LA. I'm to fly there. He's flying from Australia. Something happens when he gets home ... Next thing, Mel calls up and says, 'I'm not doing it. I've thought it over and it is not the right thing to do.' So they put Bush on the cover."

U.S. president Donald Trump claimed on Twitter in November 2017 that Time editors had told him he would "probably" be named Person of the Year for a second time, conditional on an interview and photo shoot, which he had refused. Time denied that they had made any such promises or conditions to Trump, who was named a runner-up.

== Person(s) of the Year ==
Year	Image	Choice	Lifetime	Notes	Runners-up
1927		Charles Lindbergh	1902–1974	Lindbergh completed the first solo transatlantic flight in May 1927 by piloting his monoplane Spirit of St. Louis from Garden City, New York to Paris.	Time did not release a shortlist.
1928		Walter Chrysler	1875–1940	In 1928, Chrysler oversaw a merger of his company, Chrysler, with Dodge before beginning work on the Chrysler Building.	Time did not release a shortlist.
1929		Owen D. Young	1874–1962	Young chaired a committee which authored 1929's Young Plan, a program for settlement of German reparations after World War I.	Time did not release a shortlist.
1930		Mahatma Gandhi	1869–1948	Gandhi was the leader of India's independence movement. In 1930, he led the Salt Satyagraha, a 240-mile march to protest the imposition of taxes on salt by the British Raj.	Time did not release a shortlist.
1931		Pierre Laval	1883–1945	Laval was first appointed Prime Minister of France in 1931. He was popular in the American press at the time for opposing the Hoover Moratorium, a temporary freeze on World War I debt payments that was disliked in both France and the US.	Time did not release a shortlist.
1932		Franklin D. Roosevelt	1882–1945	Roosevelt won the 1932 US presidential election by a landslide, defeating the incumbent, Herbert Hoover.	Time did not release a shortlist.
1933		Hugh S. Johnson	1882–1942	In 1933, Johnson was appointed director of the National Recovery Administration. US President Franklin D. Roosevelt gave him the task of bringing industry, labor and government together to create codes of "fair practices" and set prices.	Time did not release a shortlist.
1934		Franklin D. Roosevelt (2)	1882–1945	Roosevelt was President of the United States from 1933 to 1945. In 1934, Roosevelt's New Deal reforms were beginning to bring results.	Time did not release a shortlist.
1935		Haile Selassie	1892–1975	Selassie was Emperor of Ethiopia in 1935, when Italian forces invaded Ethiopia, starting the Second Italo-Abyssinian War.	Time did not release a shortlist.
1936		Wallis Simpson	1896–1986	In 1936, Simpson's relationship with King Edward VIII of the United Kingdom led the king to abdicate the throne to marry her.	Time did not release a shortlist.
1937		Chiang Kai-shek	1887–1975	Chiang was Premier of the Republic of China at the outbreak of the Second Sino-Japanese War in 1937.	Time did not release a shortlist.
1937		Soong Mei-ling	1898–2003	Soong was wife of Chiang Kai-shek from 1927 until his death in 1975 and was active in rallying support for the Republic of China in the US. Addressed as Madame Chiang Kai-Shek by the magazine, she was recognized together with her husband as "Man & Wife of the Year".	Time did not release a shortlist.
1938		Adolf Hitler	1889–1945	As Chancellor of Germany, Hitler oversaw the unification of Germany with Austria and the Sudetenland in 1938, after the Anschluss and Munich Agreement respectively. Instead of a conventional portrait, the cover was an illustration by Rudolph von Ripper entitled "From the unholy organist, a hymn of hate".	Time did not release a shortlist.
1939		Joseph Stalin	1878–1953	In 1939, Stalin was General Secretary of the Communist Party of the Soviet Union and Premier of the Soviet Union. He oversaw the signing of a non-aggression pact with Nazi Germany before invading eastern Poland.	Time did not release a shortlist.
1940		Winston Churchill	1874–1965	Churchill was Prime Minister of the United Kingdom during the Dunkirk evacuation and the Battle of Britain.	Time did not release a shortlist.
1941		Franklin D. Roosevelt (3)	1882–1945	Roosevelt was President of the United States in 1941 during the attack on Pearl Harbor, declaration of war against Japan and resulting entry of the United States into World War II. The editors had already chosen Dumbo as their "Mammal of the Year" before the Pearl Harbor attack, but quickly changed it to Roosevelt.	Time did not release a shortlist.
1942		Joseph Stalin (2)	1878–1953	Stalin was General Secretary of the Communist Party of the Soviet Union, overseeing the Battle of Stalingrad (1942–1943) and Second Battle of Kharkov.	Time did not release a shortlist.
1943		George C. Marshall	1880–1959	As United States Army Chief of Staff in 1943, General Marshall was instrumental in organizing US actions in World War II.	Time did not release a shortlist.
1944		Dwight D. Eisenhower	1890–1969	General Eisenhower was Supreme Allied Commander in Europe during 1944's Operation Overlord.	Time did not release a shortlist.
1945		Harry S. Truman	1884–1972	Truman became President of the United States after the death of Franklin D. Roosevelt in 1945, authorizing the atomic bombings of Hiroshima and Nagasaki.	Time did not release a shortlist.
1946		James F. Byrnes	1882–1972	In 1946, Byrnes was United States Secretary of State during the Iran crisis of 1946, taking an increasingly hardline position in opposition to Stalin. His speech, "Restatement of Policy on Germany", set the tone of future US policy, repudiating the Morgenthau Plan economic policies and giving Germans hope for the future.	Time did not release a shortlist.
1947		George C. Marshall (2)	1880–1959	Appointed United States Secretary of State in 1947, Marshall was the architect of the Marshall Plan.	Time did not release a shortlist.
1948		Harry S. Truman (2)	1884–1972	Truman was elected President of the United States in 1948, which is considered to be one of the greatest election upsets in American history.	Time did not release a shortlist.
1949		Winston Churchill (2)	1874–1965	Proclaimed as the "Man of the half-century", Churchill had led Britain and the Allies to victory in World War II. In 1949, Churchill was leader of the opposition.	Time did not release a shortlist.
1950		The American fighting-man	—N/a	Representing US troops involved in the Korean War (1950–1953)	Time did not release a shortlist.
1951		Mohammad Mosaddegh	1882–1967	In 1951, Mosaddegh was appointed Prime Minister of Iran and expelled Western oil companies, starting the Abadan Crisis.	Time did not release a shortlist.
1952		Elizabeth II	1926–2022	In 1952, Elizabeth acceded to the throne of the United Kingdom and the other Commonwealth realms upon the death of her father, King George VI.	Time did not release a shortlist.
1953		Konrad Adenauer	1876–1967	In 1953, Adenauer was re-elected as Chancellor of West Germany. Adenauer was overseeing the reconstruction of Germany and the Economic Miracle, had successfully restored relations with Germany's wartime enemies in the West, and was working towards European integration.	Time did not release a shortlist.
1954		John Foster Dulles	1888–1959	As United States Secretary of State in 1954, Dulles was architect of the Southeast Asia Treaty Organization.	Time did not release a shortlist.
1955		Harlow Curtice	1893–1962	Curtice was President of GM (General Motors) from 1953 to 1958. In 1955, GM sold five million vehicles and became the first corporation to earn US$1 billion in a single year.	Time did not release a shortlist.
1956		The Hungarian freedom fighter	—N/a	Representing Hungarian revolutionaries involved in the 1956 uprising against the Soviet-dominated government, which was put down by the Soviet Army.	Time did not release a shortlist.
1957		Nikita Khrushchev	1894–1971	In 1957, Khrushchev consolidated his leadership of the Soviet Union, surviving a plot to dismiss him by Stalinist members within the Presidium, and leading the Soviet Union into the Space Race with the launch of Sputnik 1.	Time did not release a shortlist.
1958		Charles de Gaulle	1890–1970	De Gaulle was appointed Prime Minister of France in May 1958 and, following the collapse of the Fourth Republic and establishment of the Fifth Republic, was then elected as President of France in December.	Time did not release a shortlist.
1959		Dwight D. Eisenhower (2)	1890–1969	Eisenhower was President of the United States from 1953 to 1961. In 1959, Eisenhower arranged the state visit by Nikita Khrushchev to the United States and toured several countries, becoming the first US president to visit India.	Time did not release a shortlist.
1960		U.S. Scientists	—N/a	Time claimed in 1960 "science is at the apogee of its power for good or evil", although it noted that "the 15 men [on the cover] include two or three whose greatest work is probably behind them". The cover and piece spotlights the following scientists: George Beadle, pioneer of genetics; Charles Draper, inventor of spacecraft inertial guidance systems; John Enders, pioneer of polio and measles vaccines; Donald A. Glaser, inventor of the bubble chamber; Joshua Lederberg, discoverer of bacterial conjugation; Willard Libby, contributor to radiocarbon dating; Linus Pauling, pioneer of quantum chemistry and molecular biology; Edward Purcell, co-discoverer of nuclear magnetic resonance; Isidor Rabi, co-discoverer of nuclear magnetic resonance; Emilio Segrè, discoverer of astatine, technetium and the antiproton; William Shockley, co-inventor of the transistor; Edward Teller, nuclear physicist and co-inventor of the hydrogen bomb; Charles Townes, inventor of the maser; James Van Allen, discoverer of the Van Allen radiation belt; Robert Woodward, pioneer of organic synthesis	Time did not release a shortlist.
1961		John F. Kennedy	1917–1963	Kennedy was inaugurated as President of the United States in 1961, ordering the failed invasion of Cuba by U.S.-trained Cuban exiles.	Time did not release a shortlist.
1962		John XXIII	1881–1963	Pope of the Roman Catholic Church from 1958 to 1963. In 1962, he volunteered as a mediator in the Cuban Missile Crisis between the U.S. and USSR, gaining praise from both sides. He also initiated the Second Vatican Council that same year.	Time did not release a shortlist.
1963		Martin Luther King Jr.	1929–1968	A leader of the American Civil rights movement, King delivered his famous "I Have a Dream" speech in 1963.	Time did not release a shortlist.
1964		Lyndon B. Johnson	1908–1973	Johnson was elected in his own right as President of the United States in 1964, secured the passage of the Civil Rights Act, declared a War on Poverty, and escalated US involvement in the Vietnam War.	Time did not release a shortlist.
1965		William Westmoreland	1914–2005	General Westmoreland was commander of US forces in South Vietnam during the Vietnam War.	Time did not release a shortlist.
1966		The Inheritor	—N/a	Representing a generation of American men and women, aged 25 and under – the Baby Boom generation, who in 1966 made up nearly half the population and were influential both in the counterculture of the 1960s and as drafted soldiers in the Vietnam War. The face most prominently seen on the cover representing the generation was that of Thomas M. McLaughlin.	Time did not release a shortlist.
1967		Lyndon B. Johnson (2)	1908–1973	Johnson was President of the United States from 1963 to 1969. Time noted that it had been a year of setbacks and failures for Johnson, with race riots across the US, deepening involvement in the Vietnam War, and the Dump Johnson movement within his own party.	Time did not release a shortlist.
1968		The Apollo 8 astronauts	Frank Borman: 1928–2023; Jim Lovell: 1928–2025; William Anders: 1933–2024	In 1968, the American crew of Apollo 8 (William Anders, Frank Borman and Jim Lovell) became the first humans to travel beyond low Earth orbit, orbiting the Moon and paving the way for the first human Moon landings in 1969.	Time did not release a shortlist.
1969		The Middle Americans	—N/a	Conservative, small-town Americans, also referred to as the silent majority. Time saw Middle America as the driving force behind Richard Nixon's 1968 election win, the background of the American astronauts of Apollo 11, and the conservative side of debates on social issues such as school desegregation, prayer in public schools, sex education and drugs policy.	Time did not release a shortlist.
1970		Willy Brandt	1913–1992	As Chancellor of West Germany, Brandt was acknowledged for "seeking to bring about a fresh relationship between East and West" through his "bold approach to the Soviet Union and the East Bloc". In 1970, Brandt renounced German claims on Poland and recognized East Germany, and acknowledged the Holocaust in Nazi-occupied Poland with the symbolic Kniefall von Warschau.	Time did not release a shortlist.
1971		Richard Nixon	1913–1994	Nixon was President of the United States from 1969 to 1974. In 1971, Nixon had withdrawn the US dollar from the gold standard, triggering the Nixon shock, created the Economic Stabilization Program, and re-opened relations with communist China.	Time did not release a shortlist.
1972		Richard Nixon (2)	1913–1994	As President of the United States, Nixon visited China in 1972, the first U.S. president to do so. Nixon later secured the SALT I pact with the Soviet Union before being re-elected in one of the largest landslide election victories in American history.	Time did not release a shortlist.
1972		Henry Kissinger	1923–2023	Kissinger, as Nixon's National Security Advisor, traveled with the President to China in 1972, and was negotiating peace in the Vietnam War.	Time did not release a shortlist.
1973		John Sirica	1904–1992	In 1973, as Chief Judge of the United States District Court for the District of Columbia, Sirica ordered President Nixon to turn over Watergate-related recordings of White House conversations.	Time did not release a shortlist.
1974		Faisal	1906–1975	Faisal, King of Saudi Arabia, was acknowledged in the wake of the oil crisis, which arose when Saudi Arabia withdrew its oil from world markets to protest Western support for Israel during the Yom Kippur War.	5: Yasser Arafat; Gerald Ford; Henry Kissinger; Richard Nixon; Aleksandr Solzhenitsyn
1975		American women	—N/a	Highlighting the successes of the American feminist movement and "the status of the everyday, usually anonymous woman, who moved into the mainstream of jobs, ideas and policy making". The cover and piece spotlights the following women: Susan Brownmiller, author of Against Our Will; Kathleen Byerly, first female captain in the U.S. Navy; Alison Cheek, first ordained Episcopalian minister; Jill Conway, first female president of Smith College; Betty Ford, politically active as First Lady of the United States; Ella Grasso, first female Governor of Connecticut; Carla Hills, first female United States Secretary of Housing and Urban Development; Barbara Jordan, member of the United States House of Representatives; Billie Jean King, tennis player and winner of the "Battle of the Sexes"; Carol Sutton, first female editor of a major U.S. paper; Susie Sharp, Chief Justice of the North Carolina Supreme Court; Addie Wyatt, vice president of the Amalgamated Meat Cutters trade union	9: Jerry Brown; Hugh Carey; Deng Xiaoping; Gerald Ford; Henry Kissinger; Pat Moynihan; Anwar Sadat; Andrei Sakharov; William Simon
1976		Jimmy Carter	1924–2024	In 1976, Carter was elected President of the United States, defeating incumbent President Gerald Ford.	Time did not release a shortlist.
1977		Anwar Sadat	1918–1981	Sadat, as President of Egypt, traveled to Israel in 1977—the first Arab leader to do so—to discuss normalization of relations of both countries.	Time did not release a shortlist.
1978		Deng Xiaoping	1904–1997	Deng, as Vice Premier, overthrew Hua Guofeng to assume de facto control over China in 1978, as Paramount leader.	4: Jimmy Carter; Howard Jarvis; John Paul II; Jim Jones
1979		Ruhollah Khomeini	1900–1989	Khomeini led the Iranian Revolution, overthrew Shah Mohammed Reza Pahlavi, establishing himself as Supreme Leader.	4: John Paul II; Margaret Thatcher; Paul Volcker; Young Indochinese refugees
1980		Ronald Reagan	1911–2004	Reagan was elected President of the United States in 1980, defeating incumbent President Jimmy Carter.	4: The American hostages; Herbert Boyer; Leonid Brezhnev; Lech Wałęsa
1981		Lech Wałęsa	Born 1943	Leader of the Polish Solidarity trade union and architect of the Gdańsk Agreement until his arrest by the communist authorities and the imposition of martial law in Poland in December 1981	4: Diana, Princess of Wales; Ronald Reagan; Space Shuttle Columbia; "A weapon of terror"
1982		The Computer	—N/a	Denoted "Machine of the Year" to herald the dawn of the Information Age The feature spotlights the following people, in order: Steve Jobs, founder of Apple Computer; John Opel, president and CEO of IBM; Adam Osborne, founder of Osborne Computer Corporation; Dan Bricklin, co-creator of VisiCalc; Jack Tramiel, founder of Commodore International; Clive Sinclair, founder of Sinclair Research	4: Menachem Begin; E.T.; Margaret Thatcher; Paul Volcker
1983		Ronald Reagan (2)	1911–2004	In 1983, as President of the United States, Reagan ordered the invasion of Grenada and championed the Strategic Defense Initiative.	4: Harold Greene; John Paul II; Margaret Thatcher; U.S. servicemen
1983		Yuri Andropov	1914–1984	Andropov, as General Secretary of the Communist Party of the Soviet Union, was a critic of the Strategic Defense Initiative and tried to revive the stagnating Soviet economy. Andropov was hospitalized in August 1983 and died in 1984.	4: Harold Greene; John Paul II; Margaret Thatcher; U.S. servicemen
1984		Peter Ueberroth	Born 1937	Ueberroth orchestrated the organization of the 1984 Summer Olympics, which involved a Soviet-led boycott.	4: José Napoleón Duarte; Geraldine Ferraro; Ronald Reagan; The Terrorist
1985		Deng Xiaoping (2)	1904–1997	As Paramount Leader of China, Deng acknowledged the need for "sweeping economic reforms that have challenged Marxist orthodoxies". In 1985, Deng had lifted price controls and eased the restrictions on private ownership and business.	4: Bob Geldof; Mikhail Gorbachev; Nelson Mandela; The Terrorist
1986		Corazon Aquino	1933–2009	Aquino was a prominent figure in 1986's People Power Revolution, being elected president of the Philippines.	3: Mikhail Gorbachev; Nelson and Winnie Mandela; Oliver North
1987		Mikhail Gorbachev	1931–2022	As general secretary of the Communist Party of the Soviet Union and leader of the Soviet Union, Gorbachev oversaw perestroika and glasnost political reforms in 1987, aimed at liberalizing Soviet society.	5: Óscar Arias; William Casey; Oliver North; John Poindexter; Ronald Reagan
1988		The Endangered Earth	—N/a	Planet of the Year, representing the growing environmental movement as well as several natural and ecological disasters that struck in 1988: among them were the North American drought, "syringe tide", Bangladeshi cyclone and an earthquake in Armenia, as well as ozone depletion, global warming, radioactive contamination and deforestation.	Time did not release a shortlist.
1989		Mikhail Gorbachev (2)	1931–2022	Acknowledged as "Man of the Decade". Gorbachev, as General Secretary of the Communist Party of the Soviet Union (Soviet leader), oversaw 1989's first free Soviet elections in history before the fragmentation of the Eastern Bloc and overthrow of Soviet-dominated communist governments in Eastern Europe.	Time did not release a shortlist.
1990		George H. W. Bush	1924–2018	As President of the United States, Bush oversaw U.S. involvement in the Gulf War (1990–1991).	4: Saddam Hussein; Helmut Kohl; Nelson Mandela; Boris Yeltsin
1991		Ted Turner	1938–2026	Founder of CNN. The piece particularly highlighted CNN's coverage of Operation Desert Storm and the Gulf War, proclaiming it "History as it happens".	7: George H. W. Bush; Dick Cheney; Anita Hill; Colin Powell; Norman Schwarzkopf; Clarence Thomas; Boris Yeltsin
1992		Bill Clinton	Born 1946	Clinton was elected President of the United States in 1992, defeating incumbent President George H. W. Bush.	Time did not release a shortlist.
1993		The Peacemakers	—N/a	Represented by Yasser Arafat, F. W. de Klerk, Nelson Mandela, and Yitzhak Rabin. De Klerk, as State President of South Africa, oversaw Mandela's release from prison in 1990. In 1993, the pair were negotiating the end of the Apartheid system, and had just jointly won the Nobel Peace Prize. Arafat, as President of the Palestinian National Authority, and Rabin, as Prime Minister of Israel, signed the 1993 Oslo Accord, the first face-to-face agreement between Palestinian and Israeli authorities.	Time did not release a shortlist.
1994		John Paul II	1920–2005	Pope of the Roman Catholic Church from 1978 to 2005. In 1994, he had been active in several social debates: he released a book-length interview and the English translation of the Catechism of the Catholic Church, ruled out the ordination of women, criticized the promotion of abortion and family planning at the Cairo Conference, and established relations with Israel.	Time did not release a shortlist.
1995		Newt Gingrich	Born 1943	Leader of the "Republican Revolution", a Republican Party election landslide, which led to Gingrich being elected Speaker of the House.	4: Johnnie Cochran Jr.; Richard Holbrooke; Bill Gates; Timothy McVeigh
1996		David Ho	Born 1952	Ho, a scientist, pioneered much of AIDS research. In 1996, he had announced that a medical trial of combination therapy had reduced the viral load in HIV-positive patients to levels too low to be measured, changing the disease profile from terminal to a manageable disease.	Time did not release a shortlist for 1996.
1997		Andrew Grove	1936–2016	In 1997, Grove was chairman and CEO of Intel, recognized as a pioneer in the semiconductor industry and taken as a representative of the Digital Revolution and the tech boom.	3: Diana, Princess of Wales; Alan Greenspan; Ian Wilmut
1998		Bill Clinton (2)	Born 1946	As President of the United States, Clinton was impeached in 1998 following the Lewinsky scandal. The Senate acquitted him of the charges.	5: Hillary Rodham Clinton; John Glenn; Alan Greenspan; The Irish Peacemakers; Mark McGwire
1998		Ken Starr	1946–2022	Starr, a lawyer investigating various figures within the Clinton administration, published his Starr Report in 1998, opening the door for the impeachment of Bill Clinton.	5: Hillary Rodham Clinton; John Glenn; Alan Greenspan; The Irish Peacemakers; Mark McGwire
1999		Jeff Bezos	Born 1964	Bezos is the founder and was the CEO of Amazon.com, at that point one of the most successful companies in the dot-com boom.	Time did not release a shortlist for 1999.
2000		George W. Bush	Born 1946	In 2000, Bush was elected President of the United States, defeating incumbent Vice President Al Gore.	4: David Boies; Francis Collins; J.K. Rowling; Craig Venter
2001		Rudy Giuliani	Born 1944	Giuliani, Mayor of New York City at the time of the September 11 attacks in 2001, was selected as a symbol of America's response to the attacks.	Time did not release a shortlist.
2002		The Whistleblowers	—N/a	Represented by Cynthia Cooper, Coleen Rowley, and Sherron Watkins. In 2001, Watkins uncovered accounting irregularities in the financial reports of Enron, testifying before Congressional committees the following year. In 2002, Cooper exposed a $3.8 billion fraud at WorldCom. At the time, this was the largest incident of accounting fraud in U.S. history. In 2002, Rowley, an FBI agent, gave testimony about the FBI's mishandling of information related to the September 11 attacks of 2001.	Time did not release a shortlist.
2003		The American soldier (2)	—N/a	Representing U.S. forces around the world, especially in the Iraq War (2003–2011)	Time did not release a shortlist.
2004		George W. Bush (2)	Born 1946	In 2004, Bush was re-elected President of the United States, defeating John Kerry and overseeing US involvement in the Iraq War.	Time did not release a shortlist.
2005		The Good Samaritans	—N/a	Represented by Bono, Bill Gates, and Melinda Gates. Bono, philanthropist and member of the rock band U2, helped to organize the 2005 Live 8 concerts. Bill Gates, founder of Microsoft and richest person in the world at the time, and his wife Melinda, founded the philanthropic Bill & Melinda Gates Foundation.	Time did not release a shortlist.
2006		You	—N/a	Representing individual content creators on the World Wide Web	4: Mahmoud Ahmadinejad; James Baker; Hu Jintao; Kim Jong-il
2007		Vladimir Putin	Born 1952	Putin was President of Russia from 2000 to 2008, and from 2012 onwards. In 2007, it was apparent that Putin's power would continue after his presidential term expired: he had suppressed much of the opposition to his rule, including having a suspected role in the 2006 assassination of Anna Politkovskaya and poisoning of Alexander Litvinenko, and had secured his position as Prime Minister of Russia to his loyalist successor Dmitry Medvedev.	4: Al Gore; Hu Jintao; David Petraeus; J. K. Rowling
2008		Barack Obama	Born 1961	In 2008, Obama was elected President of the United States, defeating John McCain to become President of the United States in January 2009.	4: Sarah Palin; Henry Paulson; Nicolas Sarkozy; Zhang Yimou
2009		Ben Bernanke	Born 1953	Chairman of the Federal Reserve during the 2008 financial crisis and the Great Recession	4: Usain Bolt; The Chinese Worker; Stanley McChrystal; Nancy Pelosi
2010		Mark Zuckerberg	Born 1984	Founder of the social-networking website Facebook. In 2010, Facebook passed half a billion users but was involved in privacy disputes, and Zuckerberg had been the subject of the Oscar-winning biographical film The Social Network.	4: Julian Assange; The Chilean Miners; Hamid Karzai; The Tea Party
2011		The Protester	—N/a	Recognizing the historic significance of many grassroots protests across the world during that year, such as the Arab Spring which started in Tunisia and those against austerity measures in Greece and later in Spain, against corruption in India, against the drug war in Mexico, for education in Chile, for social justice in Israel, as well as the riots in England, the anti-government protests in Russia and the emerging global Occupy movement	4: Ai Weiwei; Catherine, Duchess of Cambridge; William McRaven; Paul Ryan
2012		Barack Obama (2)	Born 1961	In 2012, Obama was re-elected President of the United States, defeating Mitt Romney.	4: Tim Cook; Fabiola Gianotti; Mohamed Morsi; Malala Yousafzai
2013		Francis	1936–2025	Elected Pope of the Roman Catholic Church in 2013, following the resignation of Benedict XVI.	4: Bashar al-Assad; Ted Cruz; Edward Snowden; Edith Windsor
2014		Ebola fighters	—N/a	"Ebola fighters" refers to health care workers who helped stop the spread of the Ebola virus during the Ebola virus epidemic in West Africa, including not only doctors and nurses, but also ambulance attendants, burial parties and others. Those represented on the covers included: Jerry Brown, the medical director at the Eternal Love Winning Africa Hospital in Monrovia, Liberia, Kent Brantly, a physician with Samaritan's Purse and the first American to be infected in the 2014 outbreak, Ella Watson-Stryker, a health promoter for Doctors Without Borders who is originally from the United States, Foday Gallah, an ambulance supervisor and Ebola survivor from Monrovia, Liberia, Salome Karwah, a trainee nurse and counselor from Liberia whose parents died of Ebola, Pardis Sabeti from the Broad Institute.	4: Masoud Barzani; Ferguson protesters; Jack Ma; Vladimir Putin
2015		Angela Merkel	Born 1954	Chancellor of Germany from 2005 to 2021, recognized for leadership in the Greek debt crisis and European migrant crisis	6: Abu Bakr al-Baghdadi; Black Lives Matter; Caitlyn Jenner; Travis Kalanick; Hassan Rouhani; Donald Trump
2016		Donald Trump	Born 1946	In 2016, Trump was elected President of the United States, defeating Hillary Clinton.	5: Beyoncé; Hillary Clinton; The CRISPR Pioneers; Recep Tayyip Erdoğan; The Hackers
2017		The Silence Breakers	—N/a	The people who spoke out against sexual abuse and harassment, including the figureheads of the American MeToo movement that went viral in 2017. Represented on the cover by strawberry picker Isabel Pascual (pseudonym), lobbyist Adama Iwu, actress Ashley Judd, software engineer Susan Fowler, singer-songwriter Taylor Swift, and a sixth woman, a hospital worker who wished to remain anonymous and whose face cannot be seen. The feature also specifically spotlights, in order: actress Alyssa Milano; activist Tarana Burke; actress Selma Blair; the seven plaintiffs in a lawsuit against the Plaza Hotel; politician Sara Gelser; entrepreneur Lindsay Meyer; dishwasher Sandra Pezqueda; actress Rose McGowan; psychotherapist and writer Wendy Walsh; blogger Lindsey Reynolds; housekeeper Juana Melara; journalist Sandra Muller; actor Terry Crews; University of Rochester professors Celeste Kidd and Jessica Cantlon; journalist Megyn Kelly; journalist Jane Merrick; producer Zelda Perkins; European Parliament member Terry Reintke; charity worker Bex Bailey; art curator Amanda Schmitt; filmmaker Blaise Godbe Lipman; anonymous former office assistant.	6: Patty Jenkins; Colin Kaepernick; Kim Jong-un; Robert Mueller; Donald Trump; Xi Jinping
2018		The Guardians	—N/a	Journalists who faced persecution, arrest or murder for their reporting. Those highlighted on four different covers were: Jamal Khashoggi, Washington Post columnist murdered for his criticism of the Saudi crown prince; Maria Ressa, editor of the Philippine news website Rappler, who was indicted for her critical coverage of Rodrigo Duterte's controversially violent policies; Wa Lone and Kyaw Soe Oo, Reuters journalists captured in Myanmar while investigating the Inn Din massacre; the staff of The Capital, a Maryland newspaper whose office was targeted by a gunman who killed five of its employees in a mass shooting.; The feature also spotlights the following journalists, in order: Shahidul Alam of Bangladesh; Nguyễn Ngọc Như Quỳnh of Vietnam; Dulcina Parra of Mexico; Luz Mely Reyes of Venezuela; Can Dündar of Turkey; Tatyana Felgenhauer of Russia; Amal Habani of Sudan; Arkady Babchenko of Russia.	6: The Activists; Ryan Coogler; Meghan, Duchess of Sussex; Moon Jae-in; Robert Mueller; Donald Trump
2019		Greta Thunberg	Born 2003	Swedish environmental activist and founder of the School Strike for Climate campaign. In 2019, Thunberg led the Global Week for Future with over four million protestors and addressed the 2019 UN Climate Action Summit with her "How Dare You" speech.	4: The Hong Kong protesters; Nancy Pelosi; Donald Trump; Whistleblower in Trump–Ukraine scandal
2020		Joe Biden	Born 1942	In 2020, Biden and Harris were elected President and Vice President of the United States respectively, defeating incumbent President Donald Trump and Vice President Mike Pence. In January 2021, Harris became the first woman, first African American, and first Asian American vice president.	3: Anthony Fauci and the Front Line Health Workers; The Movement for Racial Justice; Donald Trump
2020		Kamala Harris	Born 1964	In 2020, Biden and Harris were elected President and Vice President of the United States respectively, defeating incumbent President Donald Trump and Vice President Mike Pence. In January 2021, Harris became the first woman, first African American, and first Asian American vice president.	3: Anthony Fauci and the Front Line Health Workers; The Movement for Racial Justice; Donald Trump
2021		Elon Musk	Born 1971	CEO of Tesla, Inc., founder and CEO of SpaceX. In 2021, Musk had become the richest person in the world and first person reported to have a net worth of over 300 billion US dollars. Recognized for the achievements of stated companies in the prior years, including the first all-civilian orbital flight, as well as his public image and controversies.	Time did not release a shortlist for 2021.
2022		Volodymyr Zelenskyy	Born 1978	President of Ukraine since 2019, and supreme commander-in-chief during the 2022 Russian invasion of Ukraine	9: Liz Cheney; Ron DeSantis; Gun safety advocates; Elon Musk; Protesters in Iran; MacKenzie Scott; Supreme Court of the United States; Xi Jinping; Janet Yellen
2022		The Spirit of Ukraine	—N/a	"The Spirit of Ukraine" represents the "resilience of the Ukrainian people and the Ukrainian resistance, as well as foreign aid to Ukraine". The feature spotlights the following people and organizations, in order: Surgeon David Nott and the David Nott Foundation; Chef José Andrés and the World Central Kitchen; Restaurant owner Ievgen Klopotenko; Opera singer Sergiy Ivanchuk; Anesthetist Iryna Kondratova; Actor Liev Schreiber and BlueCheck Ukraine; Entrepreneur Oleg Rogynskyy; Entrepreneur Elon Musk (2), engineer Oleg Kutkov and Starlink; Medic Yuliia Paievska; Journalist Olga Rudenko and the Kyiv Independent	9: Liz Cheney; Ron DeSantis; Gun safety advocates; Elon Musk; Protesters in Iran; MacKenzie Scott; Supreme Court of the United States; Xi Jinping; Janet Yellen
2023		Taylor Swift (2)	Born 1989	Singer-songwriter whose 2023–2024 Eras Tour became the highest-grossing concert tour of all time. The tour had a significant cultural and economic impact in 2023. Time described Swift as the first Person of the Year to be recognized for their "achievement in the arts". Swift was also on the 2017 Person of the Year cover, called "The Silence Breakers". She was noted by the magazine as the first woman to appear twice on a Person of the Year cover.	8: Sam Altman; Barbie; Charles III; Hollywood strikers; Jerome Powell; Vladimir Putin; Trump Prosecutors; Xi Jinping
2024		Donald Trump (2)	Born 1946	In 2024, Trump was elected President of the United States for the second time, defeating incumbent Vice President Kamala Harris and becoming the second president to win two nonconsecutive terms after Grover Cleveland in 1892. He survived an assassination attempt in the summer while on the campaign trail.	9: Kamala Harris; Catherine, Princess of Wales; Elon Musk; Yulia Navalnaya; Benjamin Netanyahu; Jerome Powell; Joe Rogan; Claudia Sheinbaum; Mark Zuckerberg
2025		The Architects of AI	—N/a	Highlights the "architects" behind the rapid development of artificial intelligence (AI) technology, resulting in the AI boom that in 2025 dominated tech development. The feature spotlights the following people, in alphabetical order: Sam Altman, CEO of OpenAI; Dario Amodei, CEO of Anthropic; Demis Hassabis, CEO of Google DeepMind; Jensen Huang, CEO of Nvidia; Fei-Fei Li, known for establishing ImageNet; Elon Musk, CEO of xAI (2); Lisa Su, CEO of AMD; Mark Zuckerberg, CEO of Meta Platforms (2)	Time did not release a shortlist for 2025.

== Other categories ==
Every year, in addition to the main Person of the Year, Time (sometimes alongside a partner company) acknowledges impactful people or groups in other categories. This is a relatively recent practice, beginning in 1998 when Mark McGwire was awarded the title of Hero of the Year and becoming a regular event in 2018 with the re-introduction of the Heroes of the Year award. Heroes of the Year was joined by Athlete of the Year, CEO of the Year, Entertainer of the Year and Guardians of the Year in 2019, Kid of the Year in 2020, Breakthrough of the Year, Dreamer of the Year, Icon of the Year and Innovator of the Year in 2022, Team of the Year in 2023 and Community of the Year in 2024. In line with the introduction of these new categories, Time has expanded their annual Person of the Year private event to include and celebrate their recipients. The event, titled A Year in TIME beginning in 2023, has been held at Plaza Hotel since 2022. A Year in TIME typically features interviews, speeches and performances from some of the categories' winners, as well as winners of other Time awards. Some of these are then posted to Time's official YouTube channel.

=== Athlete of the Year ===
Athlete of the Year was awarded in partnership with Oura Health in 2021, and with LG in 2022.

Year	Choice	Notes
2019	United States women's national soccer team	The international women's soccer team for the United States, who won the 2019 FIFA Women's World Cup.
2020	LeBron James	American basketball player, won the 2020 NBA Finals with his Los Angeles Lakers.
2021	Simone Biles	American gymnast, pulled out of multiple gymnastics events during the Tokyo Olympics for mental health concerns.
2022	Aaron Judge	American baseball outfielder, hit the most home runs in a season in the history of the American League with 62.
2023	Lionel Messi	Argentine footballer, won the 2022 FIFA World Cup with Argentina national team and record eighth Ballon d'Or.
2024	Caitlin Clark	American women's basketball player, was the All-WNBA, 2024 WNBA Rookie of the Year with the Indiana Fever.
2025	A'ja Wilson	American women's basketball player, won the 2025 WNBA season with the Las Vegas Aces and was that year's WNBA Most Valuable Player, WNBA Finals Most Valuable Player and WNBA Defensive Player of the Year

=== Breakthrough of the Year ===
In 2022, this selection was called Breakthrough Artist of the Year.

Year	Choice	Notes
2022	Mickey Guyton	American country music artist
2023	Alex Newell	American actor
2025	KPop Demon Hunters	American animated film

=== CEO of the Year ===
In 2019 and 2020, this selection was called Businessperson of the Year.

Year	Choice	Notes
2019	Bob Iger	CEO and executive chairman of The Walt Disney Company
2020	Eric Yuan	CEO and founder of Zoom Video Communications
2023	Sam Altman	CEO and co-founder of OpenAI
2024	Lisa Su	CEO, president and chair of AMD
2025	Neal Mohan	CEO of YouTube

=== Community of the Year ===
Community of the Year is awarded in partnership with Land O'Lakes.

Year	Choice	Notes
2024	People of Agriculture	Representing the global rural farming community

=== Dreamer of the Year ===
Dreamer of the Year is awarded in partnership with American Family Insurance.

Year	Choice	Notes
2022	Donnel Baird	American entrepreneur and CEO of BlocPower
2023	Syd Kitson	Chairman and CEO of Kitson and Partners and former professional American football guard
2024	Portland Fire & Rescue	The fire and rescue department of Portland, which helped combat the 2024 Oregon wildfires.
2024	American Family Insurance Claims and Sales Teams, Omaha	American Family Insurance's claims support team, which provided crucial support in the aftermath of a tornado outbreak in April 2024 in Blair, Nebraska.
2024	Rebuilding Together, Tampa Bay	American non-profit organization that provided relief in the Tampa Bay area following the destruction of hurricanes Helene and Milton.
2025	Direct Relief	American non-profit organization that provided relief during the January 2025 Southern California wildfires.

=== Entertainer of the Year ===
In 2022, Entertainer of the Year was awarded in partnership with Montblanc.

Year	Choice	Notes
2019	Lizzo	American rapper and singer-songwriter
2020	BTS	South Korean K-pop boy band
2021	Olivia Rodrigo	American singer-songwriter
2022	Blackpink	South Korean K-pop girl group
2025	Leonardo DiCaprio	American actor and film producer

=== Guardians of the Year ===
In 2020, Guardians of the Year was awarded in partnership with Amazon.

Year	Choice	Notes
2019	American public servants	The feature spotlights those involved in that year's impeachment inquiry against Donald Trump, particularly Marie Yovanovitch, William Taylor, Fiona Hill, Alexander Vindman, Mark Sandy, Jennifer Williams, David Holmes, Laura Cooper and the original whistleblower.
2020	Anthony Fauci and frontline health workers	Recognising the actions of frontline health workers around the world that helped contain and reduce the effects of the COVID-19 pandemic. Fauci was the director of the National Institute of Allergy and Infectious Diseases at the time, and is credited with being a pivotal figure in the United States' fight against the pandemic.
2020	Porche-Bennett-Bey, Assa Traoré and racial justice organizers	Recognising the actions of those who organized racial justice movements such as the George Floyd protests. Bennett-Bey, a resident of Kenosha, Wisconsin, gained media attention for her activism following the shooting of Jacob Blake. Traoré is an activist and the sister of Adama Traoré, a black French man who died in police custody in 2016. The police officers accused of brutality were cleared of blame on May 29, 2020, triggering a new wave of protests against police brutality in solidarity with the at the time ongoing George Floyd protests.

=== Hero(es) of the Year ===
In 2020, Heroes of the Year was awarded in partnership with State Farm.

Year	Choice	Notes
1998	Mark McGwire	Baseball player for the St. Louis Cardinals, who hit 70 home runs in 1998, breaking the single-season home run record. In 2010, McGwire admitted he used steroids during the 1998 season.
2018	The Thai Cave Rescuers	The Tham Luang cave rescue took place during June and July 2018, where a group of 12 boys and their junior soccer team's assistant coach Ekkapol Chantawong, who had been trapped in a cave for over two weeks, were successfully located and rescued through an operation involving over 10,000 people. Time's corresponding article highlights the heroic actions of Chantawong, Narongsak Osottanakorn (the governor of Chiang Rai province at the time and overseer of the rescue operation), John Volanthen and Rick Stanton (two divers who first found the group alive), Saman Kunan (the rescue's only immediate casualty) and Richard Harris (the anaesthesiologist and cave diver who played a crucial role in the rescue).
2018	James Shaw Jr.	Shaw disarmed a gunman during the Nashville Waffle House shooting on April 22, 2018, preventing the death toll from going above 4, and started a GoFundMe campaign the following day which went on to raise over $240,000 for the families of the shooting's 4 fatalities.
2018	Brad Brown	Brown, a hospital chaplain at Feather River Hospital in Paradise, California, assisted with the evacuation of the hospital during Camp Fire and personally drove three immobile patients out of town, successfully getting them to a hospital in Chico after hours of potentially fatal road delays.
2018	Tammie Jo Shults	Shults was the pilot of Southwest Airlines Flight 1380 on April 17, 2018, who, along with her first officer Darren Lee Ellisor, saved the lives of 143 following the failure of an engine which had fragments break off that damaged other parts of the plane and killed 1 passenger.
2018	Mamoudou Gassama	On May 26, 2018, Gassama scaled four floors of an apartment building in Paris in under a minute, saving the life of a four-year-old boy dangling from a balcony and drawing comparisons to Spider-Man.
2019
2019	Defenders of Notre Dame	Time's corresponding article discusses the actions of those who saved Notre-Dame's sacred treasures during the fire on April 15, 2019 (particularly Antoine-Marie Préaut, a conservator of Paris's historic monuments, and Laurent Prades, Notre-Dame's operational director), the ~400 firefighters who combatted the fire, and those who had begun preparing for the cathedral's reconstruction.
2019	Ryan Kyote	Kyote, a nine-year-old resident of Napa, California, used his allowance to pay off his grade's $74 lunch debt. His mother posted about it on social media and the story went viral, starting a wider national movement against school lunch debt. As a result, Kyote's school district reversed their lunch debt policy and a law was passed in California banning "lunch shaming" (a term for giving worse food to students with debt).
2019	Satchel Smith	Smith, a 21-year-old student in Beaumont, Texas, was the sole employee trapped in a hotel alongside 90 guests for over 30 hours during Tropical Storm Imelda. He stayed awake during the whole ordeal, and was assisted by guests in making dinner and providing stranded truckers with food and water.
2019	Nicole Chamberlain	On November 11, 2019, Chamberlain, a bus driver in Waukesha, Wisconsin, saw a two-year-old girl and her six-year-old brother alone in temperatures below 20 °F (−7 °C) near a busy intersection. She brought them on board her bus, warmed them up and stayed with them until their grandmother showed up alongside police officers.
2019	Keanon Lowe	On May 19, 2019, Lowe, a teacher at Parkrose High School in Portland, Oregon, saw a student armed with a shotgun and successfully disarmed him, preventing his suicide and a school shooting. Immediately after, he gave the student a sympathetic hug and provided him with comforting words.
2019	Chella Phillips	Phillips, who runs a dog refuge in Nassau, Bahamas, managed to protect the refuge's 82 dogs, alongside 15 other dogs, from Hurricane Dorian in her own home. During the week following the hurricane, she sent 68 of those dogs to homes and rescue groups in the United States after her story went viral there.
2020	Australia's Volunteer Firefighters	Time's corresponding article highlights the work done by volunteer firefighters during the 2019–20 Australian bushfire season, including three that died on the job.
2020	Jason Chua and Hung Zhen Long	Chua and Hung, co-owners of the Beng Who Cooks food stall in Singapore, committed to delivering free food to those who could not afford it during COVID-19 lockdowns from April to June 2020. In total, they spent $11,000 on ~2,500 free meals.
2020	Greg Dailey	Following the rise of the COVID-19 pandemic in March 2020, Dailey, a newspaper deliveryman in Mercer County, New Jersey, began a new service of dropping off goods free of charge. During the rest of the year, he, with the help of his family, supplied over 140 homes and conducted over 1000 grocery runs in his local area.
2020	Rahul Dubey	On June 1, 2020, during the George Floyd protests in Washington, D.C., Dubey provided refuge in his home to ~70 protestors who were being barricaded and pepper-sprayed by police, even letting them stay overnight to avoid curfew breaches.
2020	Pastor Reshorna Fitzpatrick and Bishop Derrick Fitzpatrick	In April 2020, Reshorna and Derrick Fitzpatrick, a married couple who run Stone Temple Missionary Baptist Church in Chicago, began providing ~300 food boxes per week to people who became unemployed following the outbreak of the COVID-19 pandemic. They expanded their operation throughout the year, obtaining a supply of fresh produce from a local Black- and women-led nonprofit farm, providing hot soup every week and giving out supplies such as face masks and hand sanitizer.
2021	Vaccine scientists	The feature is dedicated to those that contributed to the creation of COVID-19 vaccines, and in particular spotlights Katalin Karikó, Barney S. Graham, Kizzmekia Corbett and Drew Weissman, pioneers of mRNA vaccine technology.
2022	Women of Iran	After the death of Mahsa Amini on September 16, 2022, who was arrested for allegedly wearing her hijab improperly and later died after she had been —according to eyewitnesses— severely beaten by religious morality police officers, massive global protests began. Initial protests, mostly led by women, demanded an end to the mandatory hijab law, which has been in place since the 1979 Islamic revolution. According to Iran Human Rights, at least 481 protesters including 64 minors have been killed in these protests as of January 9, 2023.

=== Icon of the Year ===
Year	Choice	Notes
2022	Michelle Yeoh	Malaysian actress
2024	Elton John	British singer-songwriter

=== Innovator of the Year ===
Year	Choice	Notes
2022	Gregory Robinson and the James Webb Space Telescope team	Robinson was the telescope's program director from 2018 to 2022.

=== Kid of the Year ===
In 2020 and 2021, Kid of the Year was awarded in partnership with Nickelodeon.

Year	Choice	Notes	Runners-up
2020	Gitanjali Rao	Scientist and inventor	4: Tyler Gordon; Jordan Reeves; Bellen Woodard; Ian McKenna
2021	Orion Jean	Humanitarian	18: Lujain Alqattawi; Mina Fedor; Sammie Vance; Alena Wicker; Lino Marrero; Jayden Perez; Ethan Hill; Gauranji Gupta; Ruby Kate Chitsey; Zoe Oli; Kai Shappley; Cash Daniels; Genshu Price; Miles Fetherston-Resch; Samirah Horton; Sadie Keller; Khloe Joiner; Jenell Theobald
2024	Heman Bekele	Scientist and inventor	5: Dom Pecora; Madhvi Chittoor; Jordan Sucato; Keivonn Woodard; Shanya Gill
2025	Tejasvi Manoj	Cybercrime activist	Time did not release a shortlist for 2025.

=== Team of the Year ===
Team of the Year is awarded in partnership with Smartsheet.

Year	Choice	Notes	Runners-up
2023	HP's Social Impact team	The team consists of Michele Malejki, Mariama Kabia, Anshu Grover, Ina Progonati, Stephanie Bormann and Julio Vera Barajas.	2: Pfizer's RSV vaccine leadership team; Syngenta's Research & Development Team

== Online poll ==
An online reader's choice poll was first held in 1998, with professional wrestler Mick Foley and murdered college student Matthew Shepard as the top vote-getters, although the final result is unknown. An online poll was also held in 2006.

From 2010 to 2022, Time held an annual online poll for the readers to vote for who they believed to be the Person of the Year. While many mistakenly believed the winner of the poll to be the Person of the Year, the title, as mentioned above, is decided by the editors of Time.

Year	Readers' Choice	Notes
2010	Julian Assange	Founder of WikiLeaks
2011	Recep Tayyip Erdoğan	Prime Minister of Turkey
2012	Kim Jong-un	Supreme Leader of North Korea
2013	Abdel Fattah el-Sisi	President of Egypt
2014	Narendra Modi	Prime Minister of India
2015	Bernie Sanders	United States Senator from Vermont and 2016 presidential candidate
2016	Narendra Modi	Prime Minister of India
2017	Mohammad bin Salman	Crown Prince of Saudi Arabia
2018	BTS	K-pop band
2019	Hong Kong Protesters	Protesters in Hong Kong in response to the extradition bill
2020	Essential Workers	Those who worked during the COVID-19 pandemic
2021	Jair Bolsonaro	President of Brazil
2022	Women Protesters in Iran	Women protesters in Iran who took part in the Mahsa Amini protests

== See also ==
- Breakthrough of the Year
- Canadian Newsmaker of the Year (Time), printed in the Canadian issue of Time until 2008
- Forbes list of the World's Most Powerful People
- Time 100
- Time 100: The Most Important People of the Century
- Time100 Impact Awards
