= Tejasvi Manoj =

American cybercrime activist

- Born: 2007 or 2008 (age 18–19); California, USA
- Known for: Computer crime countermeasures protecting seniors from cybercrime
- Parents: Manoj Ganapathy (father); Aishwarya Manoj (mother)
- Website: www.shieldseniors.com

Tejasvi Manoj is an American teenager, programmer and website developer. She received the TIME's Kid of the Year award in 2025 for her initiative to protect seniors from cybercrime.

== Early life ==
Manoj was born in California and grew up in Texas to Indian-Tamils parents. She was a student at Lebanon Trail High School in Frisco.

== Initiative to protect seniors from cybercrime ==
In 2024, Manoj and her father averted a cyber scam. Manoj's 85-year-old grandfather called them ready to wire two thousand dollars to a cybercrime operation, based on a deceitful email he received.

Manoj was inspired by the incident to develop an app designed to help seniors identify and report online scam. She subsequently launched the website Shield Seniors.

Both Manoj's parents are IT professionals that accompanied the teenager in her effort to set up the information website for the elderly.

== Recognition and awards ==
Manoj received an honorable mention in the 2024 Congressional App Challenge.

In September 2025, Manoj was named TIME Kid of the Year.
