= List of covers of Time magazine (1990s) =

This is a list of people and topics appearing on the cover of Time magazine in the 1990s. Time was first published in 1923. As Time became established as one of the United States' leading news magazines, an appearance on the cover of Time became an indicator of notability, fame or notoriety. Such features were accompanied by articles.

For other decades, see Lists of covers of Time magazine.

== 1990 ==
Date	Names or topics
January 1	Mikhail Gorbachev, Man of the Decade
January 8	Rumania & Panama
January 15	Antarctica
January 22	Charles Stuart
January 29	Joe Foss
February 5	Nelson Mandela
February 12	Military Spending
February 19	Starting Over: Mikhail Gorbachev & Vladimir Lenin
February 26	Michael Milken
March 5	Gossip
March 12	Soviet Union
March 19	Pete & Christine Busalacchi
March 26	Germany
April 2	Richard Nixon
April 9	America's Demographics
April 16	Colossal Colliders
April 23	Dan Quayle
April 30	Vietnam: 15 Years Later
May 7	Foul-Mouthed Pop Culture
May 14	Andrei Sakharov
May 21	John Sununu
May 28	Emergency Rooms
June 4	Mikhail Gorbachev
June 11	Scott Turow
June 18	Child Warriors: Tin Hle in Karen conflict
June 25	The Spotted Owl
July 2	Nelson Mandela
July 9	Abortion's Questions
July 16	The Next Generation
July 23	The Palestinians
July 30	Helmut Kohl
August 6	David Souter
August 13	Saddam Hussein
August 20	Saddam Hussein & George H. W. Bush
August 27	War in the Gulf?
September 3	GI in Saudi Arabia
September 10	Saddam Hussein
September 17	New York City
September 24	King Fahd
October 1	David Lynch
October 8	America's Children
October 15	High Anxiety (Harold Lloyd in Safety Last!)
October 22	Wynton Marsalis
October 29	GM's Saturn
November 1	Special Issue: Women
November 5	Ronald Reagan
November 12	Dick Cheney & Colin Powell
November 19	U.S. Congress (1990 elections)
November 26	The Junk Mail Explosion
December 3	Margaret Thatcher
December 10	U.S. Soldier
December 17	Too Little Rest
December 24	Kuwait
December 31	Bart Simpson

== 1991 ==
Date	Names or topics
January 7	George H. W. Bush, Man of the Year
January 14	Breast Cancer
January 21	Saddam Hussein
January 28	America Declares War
February 4	Norman Schwarzkopf
February 11	Saddam's Weird War (Battle of Khafji)
February 18	Thomas Jenkins
February 25	The End of the Gulf War in Sight
March 4	Allied Troops Enter Kuwait
March 11	Kuwait is Liberated
March 18	The Troops Come Home
March 25	Boris Yeltsin
April 1	Why Cops Turn Violent
April 8	The Simple Life
April 15	Saddam's Postwar Victims
April 22	Nancy Reagan
April 29	Nuclear Power
May 6	Scientology Exposed
May 13	Kids of Crack Addicted Parents
May 20	A Possible New Vice President for Bush: Dick Cheney, Nancy Kassebaum, Pete Wilson, Carroll A. Campbell Jr. & Colin Powell
May 27	The Magic of Orlando
June 3	Katie Koestner
June 10	The Nature of Evil
June 17	Marissa & Anissa Ayala
June 24	Geena Davis & Susan Sarandon (Thelma & Louise)
July 1	Inside the Cocaine Business
July 8	Who Are Americans?
July 15	What's in a Label?
July 22	The Colorado River
July 29	The B.C.C.I. Scandal
August 5	Saddam Hussein
August 12	The American Character
August 19	John McCarthy & Terry Anderson
August 26	Science Under Siege
September 2	Boris Yeltsin
September 9	The Soviet Union in Chaos
September 16	Lamar Alexander
September 23	Vanishing Cultures (Highland tribesman from Papua New Guinea)
September 30	Curing Infertility
October 7	A New Nuclear Balance
October 14	Jodie Foster (Little Man Tate)
October 21	Anita Hill & Clarence Thomas
October 28	Oliver North
November 4	New Age Medicine
November 11	Privacy in America
November 18	California's Dilemma
November 25	The Health-Care Crisis
December 2	Pearl Harbor Remembered
December 9	One Nation, Under God
December 16	Terry Anderson
December 23	Mikhail Gorbachev
December 30	Search for Virgin Mary

== 1992 ==
Date	Names or topics
January 6	Ted Turner, Man of the Year
January 13	The Recession
January 20	Why Are Men and Women Different?
January 27	Bill Clinton
February 3	The Fraying of America
February 10	Japan & America
February 17	Vanishing Ozone
February 24	Ronald Reagan & Pope John Paul II
March 2	Angry Voter
March 9	Susan Faludi & Gloria Steinem
March 16	Jay Leno
March 23	Bill Clinton & Paul Tsongas
March 30	Garth Brooks
April 6	Vitamins
April 13	High Cost of College
April 20	Bill Clinton
April 27	Pan Am 103
May 4	Roe v. Wade
May 11	Los Angeles Riots
May 18	Roger Keith Coleman
May 25	Ross Perot
June 1	World Conservation Summit
June 8	The Balkans (Executed Croat in Vukovar)
June 15	Sam Walton
June 22	Allergies
June 29	Ross Perot
July 6	Pills for the Mind (Kevin Buchberger)
July 13	World's Last Eden
July 20	Bill Clinton & Al Gore
July 27	Kim Zmeskal (1992 Summer Olympics)
August 3	AIDS Epidemic
August 10	Doomsday Plan
August 17	The Balkans (Prisoners in a detention camp)
August 24	George H. W. Bush
August 31	Woody Allen
September 7	Agony of Africa
September 14	Hillary Clinton
September 21	Candice Bergen (Murphy Brown)
September 28	The Economy
October 5	Lying
October 12	George H. W. Bush, Bill Clinton & Ross Perot
October 15	The New Millennium
October 19	Bill Clinton & George H. W. Bush
October 26	Ötzi the Stone Age Man
November 2	Bill Clinton
November 9	Can GM Survive?
November 16	Bill Clinton
November 23	God & Women
November 30	Princess Diana
December 7	Russia (Kolkhoz women photographed by Margaret Bourke-White)
December 14	Somalia's Agony
December 21	U.S. Enters Somalia
December 28	Science & God

== 1993 ==
Date	Names or topics
January 4	Bill Clinton, Man of the Year
January 11	Problems of Megacities
January 18	Rita Collins
January 25	Bill Clinton
February 1	Zoe Baird
February 8	Cyberpunk
February 15	Chemistry of Love
February 22	Bill Clinton as Uncle Sam
March 1	Bill Clinton
March 8	World Trade Center Bombing
March 15	David Koresh & Sheik Omar Abdel Rahman
March 22	Can Animals Think?
March 29	Boris Yeltsin
April 5	Boomers at Church
April 12	Information Superhighway
April 19	Los Angeles
April 26	Dinosaurs
May 3	David Koresh
May 10	Hillary Clinton
May 24	Kids, Sex & Values
May 31	Dr. Jack Kevorkian
June 7	Bill Clinton on the Decline
June 14	RU 486: Birth Control
June 21	Global Prostitution
June 28	Fatherhood
July 5	Striking at Terrorism
July 12	Janet Reno
July 19	The Adoption Quandary
July 26	Floods in the Midwest
August 2	Kids & Guns
August 9	Maya Culture
August 16	Overturning Reaganomics
August 23	America the Violent
August 30	David Letterman
September 6	Boom Time in the Rockies
September 13	Yitzhak Rabin & Yasser Arafat
September 20	Clinton's Health Plan
September 27	Video Games
October 4	Muslim Militant Mahmud the Red
October 11	How Life Began
October 18	Michael Durant
October 25	Eddie Vedder
November 1	Howard Stern & Rush Limbaugh
November 8	Cloning Humans
November 15	Billy Graham
November 18	The New Face of America
November 22	A New Job Climate
November 29	Is Freud Dead?
December 6	Fidel Castro
December 13	Bob Eaton, Alex Trotman & Jack Smith
December 20	Enough Violence
December 27	Angels

== 1994 ==
Date	Names or topics
January 3	Yitzhak Rabin, Yasser Arafat, F. W. De Klerk & Nelson Mandela, Men of the Year
January 10	Las Vegas
January 17	Genetic Science: How Far Do We Go?
January 24	Tonya Harding & Nancy Kerrigan (1994 United States Figure Skating Championships)
January 31	California Earthquake
February 7	Tough on Crime
February 14	Gender Politics
February 21	Tonya Harding & Nancy Kerrigan (1994 Winter Olympics)
February 28	Louis Farrakhan
March 7	Aldrich Ames
March 14	Rewriting Evolution
March 21	Hillary Rodham & Bill Clinton
March 28	Endangered Tigers
April 4	Bill Clinton & George Stephanopoulos
April 11	Derivatives on Wall Street
April 18	Battle Against Tobacco
April 25	Fighting Cancer
May 2	Richard Nixon
May 9	Nelson Mandela
May 16	War in Rwanda
May 23	Comet Hits Jupiter
May 30	Jacqueline Kennedy
June 6	Dwight D. Eisenhower
June 13	Kim Il Sung
June 20	Welfare Reform
June 27	O. J. Simpson (Murder of ex-wife and friend and arrest)
July 4	Domestic-Abuse Victim 'Rita'
July 11	Vladimir Zhirinovsky
July 18	Attention Deficit Disorder
July 25	The Internet
August 1	Rwandan Refugees
August 8	Hipper Than Thou
August 15	Infidelity
August 22	Baseball Strike
August 29	Nuclear Terrorists
September 5	Fidel Castro
September 12	Killer Microbes
September 19	Robert Sandifer
September 26	U.S. Enters Haiti
October 3	Jimmy Carter
October 10	Bill T. Jones
October 17	Sex in America
October 24	Poverty in Boom Times
October 31	New Hope for Public Schools
November 7	Newt Gingrich
November 14	Susan Smith
November 21	The G.O.P. Storms Washington
November 28	William Shatner & Patrick Stewart (Star Trek)
December 5	50 Leaders for America's Future
December 12	The Dangers of Overbreeding Dogs
December 19	Newt Gingrich as Uncle Scrooge
December 26	Pope John Paul II, Man of the Year

== 1995 ==
Date	Names or topics
January 9	Newt Gingrich
January 16	Girth of a Nation
January 23	Rush Limbaugh
January 30	Earthquake in Japan
February 6	Johnnie Cochran, O. J. Simpson, and Robert Shapiro
February 13	Stone Age Paintings
February 20	Fidel Castro
February 27	Strengthening Marriages
March 1	Cyberspace
March 6	When Did the Universe Begin?
March 13	Nicholas Leeson
March 20	Social Security
March 27	David Geffen, Steven Spielberg & Jeffrey Katzenberg
April 3	Shoko Asahara
April 10	The Resurrection by Noël Coypel (commons)
April 17	Claudia Schiffer
April 24	Vietnam
May 1	Timothy McVeigh and Oklahoma City bombing
May 8	Right-Wing Zealots
May 15	Ralph Reed
May 22	The Budget Revolution
May 29	Ramesses II
June 5	Bill Gates
June 12	Pop Culture & Values
June 19	Scott O'Grady
June 26	Estrogen
July 3	Cyber Porn
July 10	Colin Powell
July 17	Inside the Brain
July 24	Legacy of Waco
July 31	Bob Dole
August 7	Cultural Funding
August 14	Mysteries of the Deep
August 21	Cyber War
August 28	Automat by Edward Hopper
September 4	The Rape of Siberia
September 11	NATO Bombs The Serbs
September 18	Colin Powell
September 25	Michael Crichton
October 2	Emotional Intelligence
October 9	O. J. Simpson
October 16	O. J. Simpson Verdict
October 23	Dick Carver
October 30	Urban Blacks
November 6	Pat Buchanan
November 13	Yitzhak Rabin
November 20	Bob Dole
November 27	Andrew F. Hawley
December 4	Big Bang
December 11	Elisa Izquierdo
December 18	Is the Bible Fact or Fiction?
December 25	Newt Gingrich, Man of the Year

== 1996 ==
Date	Names or topics
January 8	Fat-Free Fat
January 15	William Bratton, New York City's Top Cop
January 22	What Your Doctor Can't Tell You
January 29	Steve Forbes
February 5	Is Anybody Out There?
February 12	Magic Johnson
February 19	Marc Andreessen
February 26	Pat Buchanan, Lamar Alexander & Bob Dole
March 4	George Galatis, Nuclear Whistleblower
March 11	Princess Diana
March 18	Hillary Clinton
March 25	Can Machines Think?
April 1	Norman Schwarzkopf
April 8	Search for Jesus
April 15	Ted Kaczynski
April 22	Jessica Dubroff
April 29	Back to Segregation
May 6	John F. Kennedy, Jacqueline Kennedy & Caroline Kennedy
May 13	Billy & Franklin Graham
May 20	Twisters
May 27	Special Report: Russia
June 3	Who Speaks for Kids?
June 10	Benjamin Netanyahu
June 17	America's 25 Most Influential People
June 24	Faith & Healing
June 28	Summer Olympics 1996
July 1	Hillary Clinton & Elizabeth Dole
July 8	Aliens Have Landed
July 15	Boris Yeltsin
July 22	Prince William
July 29	TWA Flight 800
August 5	Centennial Olympic Park bombing
August 12	Michael Johnson
August 19	Bob Dole & Jack Kemp
August 26	Christopher Reeve
September 2	Dick Morris & Bill Clinton
September 9	Dick Morris & Eileen McGann
September 16	Bill Gates
September 23	Diet Pill
September 30	Ned Johnson
October 7	Diane Keaton, Bette Midler & Goldie Hawn (The First Wives Club)
October 14	Working Mom Lori Lucas
October 21	News Wars
October 28	Genesis Rediscovered
November 4	Bob Dole & Bill Clinton
November 11	Suspect Political Donations
November 18	Bill Clinton
November 25	Forever Young
December 2	O. J. Simpson
December 9	Pot & Parenthood
December 16	Jesus Online
December 23	Best of '96
December 30	Dr. David Ho, Man of the Year

== 1997 ==
Date	Names or topics
January 13	Bill Gates
January 20	Where the Jobs Are?
January 27	Bill Cosby
February 3	How a Child's Brain Develops
February 10	The Return of Star Wars
February 17	O. J. Simpson
February 24	Echoes of the Holocaust
March 3	Deng Xiaoping
March 10	Dolly, Cloned Sheep
March 17	College Tuition
March 24	Does Heaven Exist?
March 31	FAA Blunders
April 7	Marshall Applewhite
April 14	Ellen DeGeneres
April 21	America's 25 Most Influential People
April 28	What's Wrong With the FBI?
May 5	How We Get Addicted
May 12	Dr. Andrew Weil
May 19	Steven Spielberg
May 21	American Visions
May 26	What's Cool This Summer?
June 2	Kelly Finn
June 9	Generation X Reconsidered
June 16	Timothy McVeigh
June 23	Roswell Files
June 30	Tobacco Settlement
July 7	America: The Inside Story
July 14	Pathfinder Lands on Mars
July 21	Jewel and the New Women of Rock
July 28	Gianni Versace & Andrew Cunanan
August 4	Mormon Tabernacle
August 11	Sharks
August 18	Steve Jobs
August 25	Death of Privacy
September 1	George Soros
September 8	Princess Diana
September 15	Princess Diana
September 22	Steve Case
September 29	How Mood Drugs Work...& Fail
October 1	Heroes of Medicine
October 6	The Promise Keepers
October 13	Brad Pitt (Seven Years in Tibet)
October 20	Hillary Clinton
October 27	What Makes a Good School?
November 3	Michael Foale
November 10	Alan Greenspan
November 17	John F. Kennedy
November 24	Bill Clinton & Saddam Hussein
December 1	Kenny McCaughey & Bobbi McCaughey
December 8	Small Towns
December 15	Al Gore
December 22	Princess Diana
December 29	Andrew Grove, Man of the Year

== 1998 ==
Date	Names or topics
January 12	Jerry Seinfeld (Seinfeld)
January 19	Toni Morrison
January 26	Fidel Castro & Pope John Paul II
February 2	Monica Lewinsky & Bill Clinton
February 9	Kenneth Starr
February 16	Bill Clinton
February 23	The Flu Hunters
March 2	Bill Clinton
March 9	Time's 75th anniversary
March 16	John Travolta
March 23	Paula Jones
March 30	Africa Rising
April 6	Armed & Dangerous
April 13	Time 100: Leaders & Revolutionaries
April 20	The Shroud of Turin
April 27	The Future of Money
May 4	Viagra: The Potency Pill
May 11	Where Are My Girls?
May 18	Cancer
May 25	Frank Sinatra
June 1	Jim Carrey (The Truman Show)
June 8	Time 100: Artists & Entertainers
June 15	Kids & Sex
June 22	Michael Jordan
June 29	Is Feminism Dead?
July 6	The Gun in America, 1998
July 13	Health Insurance
July 20	Online shopping
July 27	Ken Griffey Jr. & Mark McGwire
August 3	E. Coli
August 10	Monica Lewinsky & Bill Clinton
August 17	John Glenn (STS-95)
August 24	Bill Clinton
August 31	The Clintons
September 7	Boris Yeltsin & Bill Clinton
September 14	Is this Boom Over?
September 21	The Starr Report
September 28	White House Scandal
October 5	Oprah Winfrey (Beloved)
October 12	A Week in the Life of an L.A. Hospital
October 19	How to Make Your Kid a Better Student
October 26	The War Over Gays
November 2	Tom Wolfe
November 9	Corporate Welfare
November 16	Newt Gingrich
November 23	Herbal Medicine
November 30	Ritalin
December 7	Time 100: Builders & Titans
December 14	Moses
December 21	Bill Clinton
December 28	Kenneth Starr & Bill Clinton, Men of the Year

== 1999 ==
Date	Names or topics
January 11	The Future of Medicine
January 18	End of the World
January 25	Too Much Homework
February 1	Bill Clinton
February 8	Lauryn Hill
February 15	Alan Greenspan, Robert Rubin & Lawrence Summers
February 22	The Clinton/Lewinsky Scandal
March 1	Hillary Clinton
March 8	The Truth About Women's Bodies
March 15	Monica Lewinsky
March 22	Bill Gates
March 29	Time 100: Scientists & Thinkers
April 5	Slobodan Milosevic
April 12	War in Kosovo
April 19	Genealogy
April 26	Star Wars
May 3	Columbine Murders
May 10	Growing Up Online
May 17	Madeleine Albright
May 24	Ricky Martin (eponymous English-language album)
May 31	How to Spot a Troubled Kid
June 7	The Next Cold War
June 14	Time 100: Heroes & Icons
June 21	George W. Bush
June 28	Kosovo: The Awful Truth
July 5	Nicole Kidman & Tom Cruise (Eyes Wide Shut)
July 12	Sports-Crazed Kids
July 19	Women's Soccer
July 26	John F. Kennedy Jr.
August 2	John F. Kennedy Jr.
August 9	The Atlanta Massacre
August 16	The Blair Witch Project
August 23	How Man Evolved
August 30	Taking Care of Our Parents
September 6	Why We Take Risks?
September 13	The I.Q. Gene
September 20	Harry Potter
September 27	The New Silicon Valley
October 4	Bill Bradley
October 11	Laser Eye Surgery
October 18	Steve Jobs
October 25	Aftermath of Columbine
November 1	Low-Carb Diets
November 8	Beyond 2000
November 15	Bill Gates
November 22	Pokémon
November 29	Simple New Year's Eve
December 6	Jesus at 2000
December 13	John McCain
December 20	Columbine Tapes (Eric Harris and Dylan Klebold)
December 27	Jeff Bezos, Person of the Year
December 31	Albert Einstein, Person of the Century

Previous	Lists of covers of Time magazine	Next
1980s	1990s	2000s
