= List of covers of Time magazine (2010s) =

Time was first published in 1923. As Time became established as one of the United States' leading news magazines, an appearance on the cover of Time became an indicator of notability, fame or notoriety. Such features were accompanied by articles.

European, Middle Eastern, African, Asian and South Pacific versions of the magazine were published in addition to the United States edition. This article distinguishes versions when the covers are different.

For other decades, see Lists of covers of Time magazine.

== 2010 ==
Date	Persons or topics	Caption
January 11	Flight 253	Fear of Flying/The 4 Lessons of Flight 253
January 18	Why Your DNA Isn't Your Destiny	Why Your DNA Isn't Your Destiny/The new science of epigenetics reveals how the choices you make can change your genes-and those of your kids.
January 25	A boy	Special Report: Haiti's Tragedy
February 1	Barack Obama	Now what? Obama Starts Over.
February 8	US: A squashed American football Europe/Asia: A child walking along rubble	US: The Most Dangerous Game; Europe/Asia: Haiti: The Aftermath
February 15	Robert Gates	Man of War
February 22	US: Three generations of the same family Europe/Asia: A twisted toyota keyfob	US: The science of living longer Europe/Asia: Toyota's Tangle
March 1	US/Asia: Capital dome frozen in an ice cube Europe: An oil rig in the ocean	US/Asia: Why Washington is Frozen; Europe: Immigration: Why Europe's All at Sea
March 8	US/Asia: A member of the Taliban; Europe: A globe	US/Asia: Taking on the Taliban; Europe: Where did Europe go?
March 15	US: Tom Hanks; Europe/Asia: An F1 racing car	US: History Maker: How Tom Hanks is redefining America's past Europe/Asia: The Turbulent Times of Formula One
March 22	A hand balancing a light bulb on one finger	10 ideas for the next 10 years
March 29	US: A crowd form the word "JOBS"; Europe/South Pacific: Pope Benedict XVI; Asia: A large "O" with space inside for the caption	US: [Jobs:] Where They Are; Europe/South Pacific: The Pope's Nightmare: From Ireland to Germany, the Catholic Church is under fire over sexual abuse by priests. Will Benedict act? Asia: Obama's Return: What the US President's visit to Indonesia means for Asia
April 5	An image of the USA composed of pieces of medical equipment	Health Care Reform Comes to America
April 12	Steve Jobs	Inside Steve's Pad
April 19	US: Schoolchild sat at a desk Europe, Middle East, South Pacific & Africa: Army officer training in Wales (closeup); Asia: The back of Barack Obama's head on a Chinese flag background	US: Should Schools Bribe Kids? Europe, Middle East, South Pacific & Africa: Why Britain's election Should Be About Her; Asia: Obama's China Challenge
April 26	Road with soldiers on Asia (alternate): Benigno Aquino III	A Captain's Story; Asia (alternate): The New Aquino: Can Noynoy save the Philippines?
May 3	A contraceptive pill	The Pill: So Small. So powerful. And so misunderstood.
May 10	Didier Drogba, Lady Gaga, and Bill Clinton (Time 100)	The 100 most influential people in the world
May 17	Ship in a sea full of spilled oil	The Big Spill: What the US oil disaster means for the future of energy
May 24	US: Elizabeth Warren, Mary Schapiro, and Sheila Bair; Europe: Nick Clegg and David Cameron	US: The New Sheriffs of Wall Street; Europe: Britain's Fresh Faces; Asia: Multicolour writing which reads "The Best of Asia"
May 31	A photo montage of thousands of individual profile pictures, with "Facebook" across the middle	Facebook... and how it's redefining privacy
June 7	Pope Benedict XVI	Why Being Pope Means Never Having to Say You're Sorry
June 14	Cartoon South African footballer kicking a ball	The Global Game
June 21	An oil covered bird	How to Clean Up The Mess
June 28	US: A crumpled car license plate with the inscription "BNKRPT More Taxes, Fewer Services"; Europe, Middle East, Africa/Asia/South Pacific: Small sick child wrapped up in bed	US: The Broken States of America; Europe, Middle East, Africa/Asia/South Pacific: The Fight Against Malaria
July 5	US: Thomas Edison; Europe, Middle East, Africa/Asia/South Pacific: Refugees looking through bars	US: How one powerful idea changed America; Europe, Middle East, Africa/Asia/South Pacific: Seeking refuge
July 12	US: Capital dome over a pile of cash. Europe, Middle East, Africa/Asia/South Pacific:European hot air balloon is on floor while American and Chinese ones float overhead	US: The Best Laws Money Can Buy; Europe, Middle East, Africa/Asia/South Pacific:Why Europe Can't Get Off the Ground
July 19	Bryan Moore	The Only Child Myth
July 26	US: Jagged red and black arrows Europe, Middle East, Africa/South Pacific: David Cameron; Asia: Burmese soldier walking	US: The Economy Is Back [black up arrow]. The Economy Stinks [red down arrow]. Europe, Middle East, Africa/South Pacific: The Pragmatic Partner: Britain's David Cameron gets ready to visit the US – without stars in his eyes Asia: Burma's Long March
August 2	US: Illustration of child throwing a stone into a pond Europe, Middle East, Africa/South Pacific: Landscape of cornfield with hill in the background Asia: Man pushing a large red circle (of the Japanese flag) up a steep icy mountain	US: The Case Against Summer Vacation; Europe, Middle East, Africa/South Pacific: France's Rural Revolution; Asia: Japan's Tough Climb
August 9	Bibi Aisha	What Happens if We Leave Afghanistan
August 16	A grey dog, with a thought bubble saying "Way to go, Einstein"	What Animals Think: New science reveals they're smarter than we realized
August 23	Jonathan Franzen	Great American Novelist
August 30	A crescent and star coloured with the American stars and stripes	Is America Islamophobic?
September 6	US: An ordinary bungalow in a residential area Europe, Middle East, Africa/Asia/South Pacific: Five tomatoes attached on a vine	US: Rethinking Homeownership: Why owning a home no longer makes economic sense Europe, Middle East, Africa/Asia/South Pacific: The Real Cost of Organic Food
September 13	Europe, Middle East, Africa/South Pacific: Tony Blair; US/Asia: A Star of David made out of daisies.	Europe, Middle East, Africa/South Pacific: Blair on America; Why Israel Doesn't Care About Peace
September 20	US: Yellow school bus with pupils waving out the windows Europe, Middle East, Africa/Asia/South Pacific: Woman cooks on outdoor fire by building	US: What Makes a School Great; Europe, Middle East, Africa/Asia/South Pacific: Pakistan's Despair: After the Great Flood, a nation and its people pray for a new beginning
September 27	A tea cup with an elephant's trunk hanging out	It's Tea Party Time
October 4	A figure of a pregnant female floating	How the first nine months shape the rest of your life
October 11	A member of the Ohio Defense Force, a private militia	Locked & Loaded: The Secret World of Extreme Militias
October 18	Asia/South Pacific: Wen Jiabao; US/Europe, Middle East, Africa: A motorhome drives along a road with a large cloud overhead	Asia/South Pacific: Wen's World; US/Europe, Middle East, Africa: An American Journey
November 25	A woman's face, half of it faded out to whiteness	Alzheimer's: At last some progress against the most stubborn disease
November 1	A yellow "perfect" house is viewed through a picket fence from the ground	How to Restore the American Dream
November 8	US/Europe, Middle East, Africa/South Pacific: Meg Whitman, Marco Rubio, Rand Paul, and Christine O'Donnell; Asia: Burmese teenagers stand in a line, laughing	US/Europe, Middle East, Africa/South Pacific: Party Crashers; Asia: Young Burma
November 15	John Boehner	Mr. Speaker: How John Boehner will rule the House
November 22	US: A joint, positioned vertically up the page Europe, Middle East, Africa/Asia/South Pacific: Man wears hard-hat with many gadgets attached to it	US: The United States of Amerijuana; US: The 50 Best Inventions of 2010
November 29	Europe, Middle East, Africa/South Pacific/Asia: Aung San Suu Kyi; US: A bride and groom hold hands, viewed from the back	Europe, Middle East, Africa/South Pacific/Asia: The Lady Returns; US: Who Needs Marriage?
December 6	Disorganized section boxes with writing in (all red)	What Really Happened 2000–2010
December 13	Julian Assange	Do you want to know a secret?
December 20	US: Sarah Palin; Europe, Middle East, Africa/Asia/South Pacific: An Indonesian collects ash-covered corn	US: Palin in Progress; Europe, Middle East, Africa/Asia/South Pacific: The Best of 2010
December 27	Mark Zuckerberg (Person of the Year)	Person of the Year

== 2011 ==
Date	Persons or topics	Caption
January 10	Aung San Suu Kyi	The Fighter
January 17	US: A man stands in shallow water with a telescope Europe, Middle East, Africa/Asia/South Pacific: A Marine carries a wounded Afghan child	US: Where the jobs are Europe, Middle East, Africa/Asia/South Pacific: The Fragile Progress in Afghanistan
January 24	Jared Lee Loughner	Guns. Speech. Madness.
January 31	US/Asia/South Pacific: Small child plays violin next to a tall mother Europe, Middle East, Africa: Dark track through a forest	US/Asia/South Pacific: The Truth About Tiger Moms; Europe, Middle East, Africa: Not Out of The Woods
February 7	Barack Obama & Ronald Reagan	Why Obama ♥ Reagan
February 14	Egyptian Revolutionaries	Revolution. And what it means for the Middle East.
February 21	Back of a head with wire coming out the neck	2045: The Year Man Becomes Immortal
February 28	A group of young activists in Cairo	The Generation Changing the World
March 7	US: A human's back, hunched in pain Europe, Middle East, Africa/Asia/South Pacific: Muammar Gaddafi	US: Understanding Pain; Europe, Middle East, Africa/Asia/South Pacific: Last Stand
March 14	A hand points downward, with the finger reading "We're #1"	Yes, America Is in Decline
March 21	US: A head silhouette composed by coloured strips with writing on: the words are things that would describe an individual Europe, Middle East, Africa/Asia/South Pacific: A human's back, hunched in pain	US: [Shopping tag] Your Data For Sale: Everything about you is being tracked – get over it Europe, Middle East, Africa/Asia/South Pacific: Understanding Pain
March 28	A woman sobs after the Koji Haga Japan earthquake	Japan's Meltdown
April 4	Muammar Gaddafi	What If He Doesn't Go?: The War Against Gaddafi
April 11	Nugget of shale	This Rock Could Power the World
April 18	US: Abraham Lincoln; Europe, Middle East, Africa/Asia/South Pacific: An Eye of Horus with a victory fist inside	US: Why We're Still Fighting The Civil War; Europe, Middle East, Africa/Asia/South Pacific: Egypt's Unfinished Revolution
April 25	US: An image of demons Europe, Middle East, Africa/Asia/South Pacific: Older man riding a bicycle	US: What if there's no Hell? Europe, Middle East, Africa/Asia/South Pacific: Forever Young: More people are behaving as if they'll never grow old. Is that such a good idea?
May 2	Images of the People on the Time 100 2011	The Time 100
May 9	Robert Mueller	The Terrorist Hunter
May 16	Prince William, Duke of Cambridge and Catherine, Duchess of Cambridge	The Royal Wedding [Special Commemorative Issue]
May 20	US: Osama bin Laden with a red cross over his face	US: The End of Bin Laden
May 23	Rubik's cube with American and Pakistani flags instead of the regular multicolouring	Why The US Is Stuck With Pakistan
May 30	Small piglet at the bottom right corner, the rest of the page is devoted to the caption	Sex. Lies. Arrogance. What Makes Powerful Men Act Like Pigs
June 6	A brain drawing with areas of optimism and pessimism	The Science of Optimism
June 13	US: Mehmet Oz and a patient Europe, Middle East, Africa/Asia/South Pacific: A rhinoceros	US: Health Special Report; Europe, Middle East, Africa/Asia/South Pacific: Rhinos at Risk
June 20	A one dollar bill sliced into five progressively smaller pieces	What Recovery: Five Myths About the Economy
June 27	US: Mitt Romney, Jon Huntsman Jr., Tim Pawlenty, Newt Gingrich, Michele Bachmann, Rick Santorum, Ron Paul, Sarah Palin, & Herman Cain; Europe, Middle East, Africa/Asia/South Pacific: Mehmet Oz and a patient	US: Baracketology; Europe, Middle East, Africa/Asia/South Pacific: Taking Cancer Seriously
July 4	United States Constitution with the lower half shredded	Does the US Constitution Still Matter
July 11	Two crosses in the ground marking deaths	Mexico's tragedy
July 18	A fish lying on blue	The future of fish: Can farming save the last wild food?
July 25	Rupert Murdoch	SCANDAL!
August 8	US: A woman cleans up while a man stands behind a wall with a baby Europe, Middle East, Africa/Asia/South Pacific: A man leads two camels through the desert	US: Chore wars Europe, Middle East, Africa/Asia/South Pacific: Travels through Islam
August 15	George Washington from a United States one-dollar bill with a black eye	The Great American Downgrade
August 22	Tracksuited figure walks in front of burning background. The image is tinted red.	The Decline And Fall of Europe (And maybe the West)
August 29	Ex-servicepeople	The new greatest generation
September 5	Muammar Gaddafi	The World After Gaddafi
September 12	A circle of food items	What to Eat Now
September 19	Tribute in Light viewed from space	Beyond 9/11
September 25	Rick Perry	The Rise of Rick Perry
October 3	US: Three children sit at a table; one has a large slice of cake, the others have small slices Europe, Middle East, Africa/Asia/South Pacific: A 5 euro note split in half and taped together with black, red and yellow tape (the German flag)	US: Why Mom Liked You Best: The Science of Favoritism; Europe, Middle East, Africa/Asia/South Pacific: Why Germany Can't Save the World
October 10	US: Pile of banknotes slashed in half leaving it low on the right hand side Europe, Middle East, Africa/Asia/South Pacific : Dalai Lama's robes, spectacles and shadow with no person inside	US: What We Spend [Special Money Issue] Europe, Middle East, Africa/Asia/South Pacific: Tibet's Next Incarnation
October 17	Steve Jobs (young)	Steve Jobs 1955 – 2011
October 24	US: A lone loudspeaker sits in blackness Europe, Middle East, Africa/Asia/South Pacific: A valley	US: The Return of The Silent Majority; Europe, Middle East, Africa/Asia/South Pacific: Why the US will never save Afghanistan
October 31	US: Chinese child blows bubble gum which is red with stars (the Chinese flag); Europe, Middle East, Africa/Asia/South Pacific: Tintin looks into a mirror to see himself reflected as he is in the animated film The Adventures of Tintin: The Secret of the Unicorn	US: The China Bubble; Europe, Middle East, Africa/Asia/South Pacific: Inside Tintin
November 7	Hillary Clinton	Hillary Clinton & The Rise of Smart Power
November 14	US: Two broken pencils and two unbroken pencils alternately Europe, Middle East, Africa/Asia/South Pacific: Three children sit at a table; one has a large slice of cake, the others have small slices	US: Can You Still Move Up in America? Europe, Middle East, Africa/Asia/South Pacific: Why Mom Liked You Best: The Science of Favoritism
November 21	US: United States Army soldiers Europe, Middle East, Africa/South Pacific: Silvio Berlusconi; Asia: A green elephant (India) fights a red dragon (China)	US: An Army Apart; Europe, Middle East, Africa/South Pacific: The Man Behind The World's Most Dangerous Economy; Asia: India vs. China: Which Economy Will Rule The World?
November 28	US: A mechanical hummingbird Europe, Middle East, Africa/Asia/South Pacific: Recep Tayyip Erdoğan	US: The Invention Issue; Europe, Middle East, Africa/Asia/South Pacific: Erdogan's Way
December 5	US: String of wool held by cartoon figure Europe, Middle East, Africa/Asia/South Pacific: Activist wearing a gas mask walks away from a fire in the street	US: Why Anxiety is Good For You; Europe, Middle East, Africa/Asia/South Pacific: Revolution Redux
December 12	US: Mitt Romney; Europe, Middle East, Africa: Vladimir Putin; Asia/South Pacific: Aung San Suu Kyi	US: Why Don't They Like Me? Europe, Middle East, Africa: The Putin Problem; Asia/South Pacific: Brave New Burma
December 19	US: Hundreds of cars line up with caption over them Europe, Middle East, Africa/Asia/South Pacific: Sergio Marchionne sits inside a Fiat 500	US: How America Started Selling Cars Again; Europe, Middle East, Africa/Asia/South Pacific: Car Star
December 26	The Protester (representing all activists)	Person of the Year

== 2012 ==
Date	Persons or topics	Caption
January 9	Background of every headline from the previous year in multicolours, while the large numbers 20 and 12 hold the caption in the bottom of the first "2"	User's Guide: Essential Info For The Year Ahead
January 16	US: Mitt Romney; Europe, Middle East, Africa/Asia/South Pacific: Dead person lies on tarmac	US: So You Like Me Now?: How Mitt Romney pulled ahead of the pack Europe, Middle East, Africa/Asia/South Pacific: Pakistan's Dark Heart
January 23	Warren Buffett	The Optimist: why Warren Buffett is bullish on America
January 30	Barack Obama	Obama's World: An exclusive interview.
February 6	US: Small boy stands in corner of large room with a megaphone Europe, Middle East, Africa/Asia/South Pacific: Lionel Messi	US: The Power Of (shyness); Europe, Middle East, Africa/Asia/South Pacific: King Leo
February 13	Preet Bharara	This Man Is Busting Wall St.
February 20	US: Large dog sits with a small one Europe, Middle East, Africa/Asia/South Pacific: Mario Monti	US: The Surprising Science of Animal Friendships; Europe, Middle East, Africa/Asia/South Pacific: Can This Man Save Europe?
February 27	US, Europe, Middle East, Africa/South Pacific: Kim Jong-un; Asia: Jeremy Lin	US, Europe, Middle East, Africa/South Pacific: Lil' Kim; Asia: Linsanity!
March 7	US: Images of Latin people Europe, Middle East, Africa/Asia/South Pacific: Vladimir Putin stands small at the bottom of the page Europe, Middle East, Africa (alternate): Youssou N'Dour	US: Yo Decido. Why Latinos will pick the next president. Europe, Middle East, Africa/Asia/South Pacific: Russia's Incredible Shrinking Prime Minister; Europe, Middle East, Africa (alternate): Voice of Protest
March 12	Lightbulb	Who will save Syria?/10 ideas that are changing your life
March 19	Battered Syrian street	Escape From Syria
March 26	US: Woman symbol made of folded up money Europe, Middle East, Africa/Asia/South Pacific: René Redzepi; Europe, Middle East, Africa (alternate): Joseph Kony; Asia (alternate): Narendra Modi	US: The Richer $ex Europe, Middle East, Africa/Asia/South Pacific: Locavore Hero; Europe, Middle East, Africa (alternate): Hunting Joseph #Kony; Asia (alternate): Modi Means Business: But Can He Lead India?
April 2	Weak man flexes muscles Europe, Middle East, Africa (alternate): Nicolas Sarkozy	The Wimpy recovery Europe, Middle East, Africa (alternate): Adieu? Nicolas Sarkozy faces the prospect of being a one-term president
April 9	An oil drop	The Truth About Oil
April 16	Man sits on stool surrounded by cloud, looking through binoculars	Rethinking Heaven
April 23	US/Asia/South Pacific: George W. Bush, Barack Obama and Bill Clinton; Europe, Middle East, Africa: Juan Manuel Santos	US/Asia/South Pacific: The World's Most Expensive Club; Europe, Middle East, Africa: The Colombian Comeback
April 30	100	The 100 Most Influential People in the World
May 7	US/Europe, Middle East, Africa/Asia: Headline with helicopters Asia (alternate)/South Pacific: Bo Xilai	US/Europe, Middle East, Africa/Asia: The Last Days of Osama bin Laden; Asia (alternate)/South Pacific: Red Alert
May 14	Bo Xilai (coloured red)	The People's Republic of Scandal
May 21	US: Child stands on chair to suckle his mother's breast Europe, Middle East, Africa/Asia: Francois Hollande; Asia (alternate)/South Pacific: Sachin Tendulkar	US: Are you mum enough? Europe, Middle East, Africa/Asia: Bonjour, Anglela; Asia (alternate)/South Pacific: The God of Cricket
May 24	US: Lee Corso	
May 28	Benjamin Netanyahu	King Bibi
June 4	US: Lenore & Mitt Romney; Europe, Middle East, Africa/Asia/South Pacific: Elizabeth II	US: Raising Romney; Europe, Middle East, Africa/Asia/South Pacific: The Diamond Queen
June 11	US: All red, with white headline in the center Europe, Middle East, Africa/Asia/South Pacific: Wayne Rooney after England left the 2010 World Cup; Asia (alternate): Hamid Karzai	US: How To Die: What I Learned From The Last Days Of My Mom and Dad; Europe, Middle East, Africa/Asia/South Pacific: The Tragedy Of English Football; Asia (alternate): Karzai Alone
June 18	US: Anthony Kennedy; Europe, Middle East, Africa/Asia/South Pacific: Red with Chinese fire-breathing dragon	US: The Decider; Europe, Middle East, Africa/Asia/South Pacific: The Next Leap Forward
June 25	Immigrants gather	We are Americans – Just not legally
July 2	US: Garden scenes Europe, Middle East, Africa/Asia/South Pacific: iPhone layering with factory inside	US: The History of the American Dream: Is it still real? Europe, Middle East, Africa/Asia/South Pacific: Made in China
July 9	Masked activist (red); Asia (alternate): Leung Chun-ying	The Revolution That Wasn't; Asia (alternate): Can Hong Kong Trust This Man?
July 16	US: John Roberts; Europe, Middle East, Africa/South Pacific: Angela Merkel; Asia: Manmohan Singh	US: Roberts Rules; Europe, Middle East, Africa/South Pacific: Why Everybody Loves To Hate Angela Merkel: And why everybody is wrong. Asia: The Underachiever
July 23	US: A lone soldier stands to play a bugle salute Europe, Middle East, Africa/Asia/South Pacific: Foggy black and white photograph of the Palace of Westminster	US: One A Day; Europe, Middle East, Africa/Asia/South Pacific: Barclays is Just The Beginning
July 30	Many Olympic sportspeople from London 2012, variating by region	Summer Olympics Special
August 6	Red gun schematic	How Guns Won
August 13	US: The White House with a 'for sale' sign outside reading $2.5 billion Europe, Middle East, Africa/Asia/South Pacific: Darkened figure	US: How to Buy The White House; Europe, Middle East, Africa/Asia/South Pacific: The Battle For Jerusalem
August 20	Curiosity rover	Mars: What we can learn from a robot 154 million miles away Europe, Middle East, Africa/Asia/South Pacific: Mars: what we can learn from a robot 248 km away
August 27	Many pictures	The Wireless Issue
September 3	Mitt Romney	The Mind of Mitt
September 10	US/Europe, Middle East, Africa/Asia/South Pacific: Barack Obama; Asia (alternative): Aamir Khan	US/Europe, Middle East, Africa/Asia/South Pacific: What Obama Knows Now; Asia (alternative): Khan's Quest
September 17	US: Headline in the style of an American banknote Europe, Middle East, Africa/Asia/South Pacific: A man stands on a tank	US: One Nation Subsidized: How Big Government underwrites your life Europe, Middle East, Africa/Asia/South Pacific: The End of Al-Qaeda?
September 24	US/Europe, Middle East, Africa/South Pacific: Protesting Arabs; Asia: Red paper wall on bottom of page against black background Europe, Middle East, Africa (alternative): Paul Kagame	US/Europe, Middle East, Africa/South Pacific: The Agents of Outrage; Asia: The New Great Wall; Europe, Middle East, Africa (alternative): The Strong Man
October 1	Bill Clinton	5 Ideas That Are Changing The World
October 8	Mitt Romney image in a stained glass window	The Mormon Identity
October 15	US/Europe, Middle East, Africa/Asia/South Pacific: Mitt Romney and Barack Obama; Europe, Middle East, Africa: Enda Kenny; Europe, Middle East, Africa (alternative): Mahmoud Abbas	US/Europe, Middle East, Africa/Asia/South Pacific: Who is tiling the truth? The Fact Wars; Europe, Middle East, Africa: The Celtic Comeback; Europe, Middle East, Africa (alternative): Abbas Undaunted
October 22	Xi Jinping	The Next Leader of the Unfree World
October 29	US: Fancy blackboard Europe, Middle East, Africa/Asia/South Pacific: Light bulb in Indian colours	US: Reinventing College; Europe, Middle East, Africa/Asia/South Pacific: Reinventing India
November 5	US: Daniel Day-Lewis as Abraham Lincoln (Lincoln); Europe, Middle East, Africa/Asia/South Pacific: Daniel Day-Lewis	US: What Would Lincoln Do? Europe, Middle East, Africa/Asia/South Pacific: The World's Greatest Actor
November 12	Europe, Middle East, Africa/Asia/South Pacific: Mario Balotelli; US: Red/blue circles saying "Vote Romney" or "Vote Obama; US: Wave on a stormy sea	Europe, Middle East, Africa/Asia/South Pacific: The Meaning of Mario; US: Special Report: The Choice; US: Lessons from the Storm
November 19	Barack Obama	'We've Got More Work to Do'
November 26	US: David Petraeus; Europe, Middle East, Africa/Asia/South Pacific: Red microphone	US: The Petraeus Affair; Europe, Middle East, Africa/Asia/South Pacific: Bad News at the BBC
December 3	US/Asia/South Pacific: Different food groups arranged into eight squares around the caption Europe, Middle East, Africa: A tree behind which is a large sun	US/Asia/South Pacific: What To Eat NowEurope, Middle East, Africa: Africa Rising
December 10	Europe, Middle East, Africa/Asia/South Pacific: Mohamed Morsi; Europe, Middle East, Africa (alternative): Enrique Peña Nieto	Europe, Middle East, Africa/Asia/South Pacific: The Most Important Man in the Middle East; Europe, Middle East, Africa (alternative): Old Party, New Stuart
December 17	US: Roger Goodell; Europe, Middle East, Africa/Asia/South Pacific: Imran Khan; Asia (alternative): Red circle to the right of the page Asia (alternative): Park Geun-hye	US: The Enforcer; Europe, Middle East, Africa/Asia/South Pacific: The Long Shot; Asia (alternative): Japan Moves Right; Asia (alternative): The Strongman's Daughter
December 24	A baby with many labels of illnesses, such as cancer, dementia and obesity	Want To Know My Future?
December 31	Barack Obama	Person of the Year 2012

== 2013 ==
Date	Persons or topics	Caption
January 14	US: Operation bed Europe, Middle East, Africa/Asia/South Pacific: Image of the polio virus	US: 40 years ago, abortion-rights activists won an epic victory with Roe V. Wade: They've Been Losing Ever Since; Europe, Middle East, Africa/Asia/South Pacific: Killing Polio
January 21	US: Chris Christie; Europe, Middle East, Africa/Asia/South Pacific: Thein Sein	US: The Boss. Europe, Middle East, Africa/Asia/South Pacific: Burma Unbound
January 28	US: Michael Bloomberg, Joe Biden and Gabby Giffords; Europe, Middle East, Africa/Asia/South Pacific: Mario Draghi	US: The Gunfighters; Europe, Middle East, Africa/Asia/South Pacific: Euro Vision
February 4	Kathryn Bigelow	Art of Darkness
February 11	drone flying over a house	Rise of the Drones
February 18	Marco Rubio	Marco Rubio & The Next America
February 25	Pope Benedict XVI	The Once And Future Pope
March 4	US: Tablet with "Bitter pill" inscribed on it Europe, Middle East, Africa/Asia/South Pacific: Indian man holds cloth over mouth and nose Europe, Middle East, Africa (alternate): Neymar	US: Why Medical Bills Are Killing US; Europe, Middle East, Africa/Asia/South Pacific: Contagion; Europe, Middle East, Africa (alternate): The Next Pelé
March 11	Oscar Pistorius	Man; Superman; Gunman
March 18	US/Europe, Middle East, Africa/Asia/South Pacific: Sheryl Sandberg; Europe, Middle East, Africa (alternate): Hugo Chávez	US/Europe, Middle East, Africa/Asia/South Pacific: Don't Hate Her Because She's Successful; Europe, Middle East, Africa/Asia/South Pacific: After Chávez
March 25	Pope Francis (conclave)	New World Pope
April 1	Cancerous microbe	How to Cure Cancer
April 8	US: Gay couples kissing Europe, Middle East, Africa/Asia/South Pacific: Christine Lagarde	US: Gay Marriage Already Won; Europe, Middle East, Africa/Asia/South Pacific: Can This Woman Save Europe?
April 15	Pastor Wilfredo de Jesus	The Latino Reformation
April 22	Headline showing robots welding it	Made in the USA
April 29	Jennifer Lawrence/Malala Yousafzai/Li Na/Elon Musk/Aamir Khan/Jay-Z/Rand Paul	The 100 Most Influential People in the World
May 13	US/Europe, Middle East, Africa/South Pacific: The Statue of Liberty holding security cameras Asia: Uniqlo roll-up vest	US/Europe, Middle East, Africa/South Pacific: Homeland Insecurity; Asia: Can This Vest Save Japan?
May 20	A woman taking picture of herself with an iPhone	The Me Me Me Generation
May 27	Angelina Jolie	The Angelina Effect
June 3	US/Asia/South Pacific: A stormy tornado sky Europe, Middle East, Africa: David Cameron	US: 16 minutes. that's how much time you have to save your life. The story of the Oklahoma tornado. Asia/South Pacific: 16 minutes. That's how much time Oklahomans had to save their lives from a killer tornado. Europe, Middle East, Africa: The Good European
June 10	US: Rahm Emanuel; Europe, Middle East, Africa/Asia/South Pacific: Barbed wire jail, tinged red	US: Chicago Bull; Europe, Middle East, Africa/Asia/South Pacific: Why Gitmo Will Never Close
June 17	Chinese paper cutting artwork featuring China at the middle of the earth by Ai Wei Wei	The World According to China
June 24	Aaron Swartz, Edward Snowden, Chelsea Manning	The Informers
July 1	US: Decorators painting the background blue Europe, Middle East, Africa/Asia/South Pacific: Ashin Wirathu	US: How service can save us Europe, Middle East, Africa/Asia/South Pacific: The Face of Buddhist Terror
July 8	Female head silhouette filled with cartoons	The Pursuit of Happiness
July 22	Street protesters, right half red	Egypt: World's Best Protestors – World's Worst Democrats: The Street Rules
July 29	US: An X-ray image of a hoodie Europe, Middle East, Africa/Asia/South Pacific: Pope Francis	US:After Trayvon; Europe, Middle East, Africa/Asia/South Pacific: The People's Pope
August 5	A city skyline showing skyscrapers	US: Is your city next? : Lessons from Detroit's fight to survive Europe, Middle East, Africa/Asia/South Pacific: America's Broken Cities: Lessons from Detroit's fight to survive
August 12	US: A young couple relaxing on the beach Europe, Middle East, Africa/Asia/South Pacific: A golden euro sign being tugged on by ribbons in the colours of the German flag	US: The childfree life Europe, Middle East, Africa/Asia/South Pacific: Why Germany must save the Euro to save itself
August 19	US/Europe, Middle East, Africa: A lone bee on a black background Asia/South Pacific: A selection of Australian people	US/Europe, Middle East, Africa: A world without bees Asia/South Pacific: We are Australia: The true face of the lucky country
August 26	Martin Luther King Jr.	Founding Father
September 9	Barack Obama (small)	The Unhappy Warrior
September 16	US: Johnny Manziel from below Europe, Middle East, Africa/Asia/South Pacific: Vladimir Putin	US: It's time to pay college athletes Europe, Middle East, Africa/Asia/South Pacific: The World According to Vladimir Putin
September 23	US/Asia/South Pacific: Charging Bull wearing a party hat and surrounded by confetti Europe, Middle East, Africa: Angela Merkel	US/Asia/South Pacific: How Wall Street Won: Five Years After the Crash, It Could All Happen Again; Europe, Middle East, Africa: The Angela Enigma
September 30	Mainly the headline and caption, with the word "Google" stylized as the Google logo	Can Google Solve Death?
October 7	US:Young children in academic dress Europe, Middle East, Africa/Asia/South Pacific: Japanese military aircraft	US:Class of 2025: How they'll learn and what they'll pay Europe, Middle East, Africa/Asia/South Pacific: Japan Rising
October 14	US: monochrome United States Capitol in cloudy sky Europe, Middle East, Africa/Asia/South Pacific: Hassan Rouhani	US: crossed-out "Majority Rule"; Europe, Middle East, Africa/Asia/South Pacific: What's the deal?
October 21	US: Michael Bloomberg; Europe, Middle East, Africa/Asia/South Pacific: The back of Barack Obama's head	US: Bloomberg Unbound; Europe, Middle East, Africa/Asia/South Pacific: Asia's Obama Problem
October 28	US: Texas outline cartoon composed of the 49 other states Europe, Middle East, Africa/Asia/South Pacific: Benedict Cumberbatch	US: United States of Texas; Europe, Middle East, Africa/Asia/South Pacific: Playing Genius
November 4	Charles, Prince of Wales	The Forgotten Prince
November 11	Laptop trapped in large spiders' web	The Secret Web: Where Drugs, Porn and Murder Hide Online
November 18	US: Chris Christie; Europe, Middle East, Africa/Asia/South Pacific: David Chang, René Redzepi, Alex Atala	US: The Elephant in the Room; Europe, Middle East, Africa/Asia/South Pacific: The Gods of Food
November 25	US: John F. Kennedy shortly before his assassination Europe, Middle East, Africa/Asia/South Pacific: A woman stands among the wreckage caused by Typhoon Haiyan in Tacloban, Philippines.	US: The Moment That Changed America; Europe, Middle East, Africa/Asia/South Pacific: The Typhoon's Toll
December 2	US: A broken tablet with Obamacare written on it Europe, Middle East, Africa/Asia/South Pacific: Illustration of a large pair of hands holding a Chinese baby	US: Broken Promise: What This Means For This Presidency; Europe, Middle East, Africa/Asia/South Pacific: China's One Child Crisis
December 9	US: A deer standing in a field Europe, Middle East, Africa/Asia/South Pacific: Barack Obama	US: America's pest problem Europe, Middle East, Africa/Asia/South Pacific: Obama's Iran Gamble
December 16	US: Carl Icahn; Europe, Middle East, Africa/Asia/South Pacific: Abu Bakr al-Baghdadi	US: Master of the Universe; Europe, Middle East, Africa/Asia/South Pacific: Al-Qaeda's Dark Star Rises
December 19	Nelson Mandela	Protester, Prisoner, Peacemaker
December 23	Pope Francis	Person of the Year 2013
December 30	A shark jumping to eat a seal	The year in pictures

== 2014 ==
Date	Persons or topics	Caption
January 13	US: Seth Meyers; Europe, Middle East, Africa/Asia/South Pacific: 2014	US: 2014: The Year Ahead; Europe, Middle East, Africa/Asia/South Pacific: A User's Guide
January 20	Janet Yellen	The Sixteen Trillion Dollar Woman: The U.S. economy is now in her hands, what will Janet Yellen do with it?
January 27	Woman's leg in high heel shoe, Obama hanging on to the heel	Can anyone stop Hillary?: How to scare off your rivals without actually running (yet)
February 3	Woman smelling breeze	The Mindful Revolution: The science of finding focus in a stressed-out, multitasking culture
February 10	US: Cartoon of an Olympic skier with Olympic rings made of barbed wire Europe, Middle East, Africa/Asia/South Pacific: Yulia Lipnitskaya	Olympic Preview Fears & Cheers: Inside Sochi's Ring of Steel
February 17	"Hyperspace" with yellow writing Europe, Middle East, Africa (alternate): Francois Hollande	The Infinity Machine; Europe, Middle East, Africa (alternate): Francois Hollande's greatest challenge is not his personal life-it's his reform plan. Can he fix France?
February 24	US: A university graduate with "just hired" written on his mortarboard Europe, Middle East, Africa/Asia/South Pacific: Enrique Peña Nieto	US: The diploma that works: Inside the six-year high school Europe, Middle East, Africa/Asia/South Pacific: Saving Mexico: How Enrique Peña Nieto's sweeping reforms have changed the narrative in his narco-stained nation
March 3	The American Airlines Integrated Operations Control Center in Fort Worth during the February 13 East Coast blizzard	US: Airport Confidential: Who Really Decides Which Flights Get Canceled; Europe, Middle East, Africa/Asia/South Pacific: Airport Confidential: A View From The Other Side of a Travel Nightmare
March 10	US: A group of Healthcare.gov developers Europe, Middle East, Africa/Asia/South Pacific: Independence Square in Kyiv, Ukraine, battered during Euromaidan	US: Code Red_; Europe, Middle East, Africa/Asia/South Pacific: This isn't over
March 17	US: View from the top of One World Trade Center; Europe, Middle East, Africa/Asia/South Pacific: Vladimir Putin's right half face and people rallying during Euromaidan	US: The Top of America: The Inside Story of Building One World Trade Center; Europe, Middle East, Africa/Asia/South Pacific: Putin's Gamble: Russia's leader seems to hold all the cards in Crimea. But he hasn't won yet
March 24	Key & Peele	The Ideas Issue
March 31	US: Landmasses fashioned as fighting men Europe, Middle East, Africa/Asia/South Pacific: Black lines which resembles the Malaysia Airlines Flight 370	US: This Land is My Land: Russia, Crimea, and a Return to the Old World Order; Europe, Middle East, Africa/Asia/South Pacific: The Mystery of Flight 370
April 7	US: Jon Hamm and Christina Hendricks; Europe, Middle East, Africa/Asia/South Pacific: People supporting their candidates in the upcoming 2014 Indian general election and a flag of India	US: The Last Days of Mad Men; Europe, Middle East, Africa/Asia/South Pacific: What India Wants: 814 million voters expect more from their leaders
April 14	Afghan women awaiting voter registration	Return of the Taliban: These women want to vote. The Taliban wants to stop them. What America leaves behind in Afghanistan
April 21	US: Synthetic marijuana Europe, Middle East, Africa/Asia/South Pacific: A Jewish man praying	US: It's Sold openly in stores, popular with kids and unpredictably dangerous. The Rise of Fake Pot; Europe, Middle East, Africa/Asia/South Pacific: Christians and Tyrants: Why the Middle East's persecuted minority is making unholy choices
April 28	US: A forest nightscape punctuated by the Moon; Europe, Middle East, Africa/Asia/South Pacific: Shinzo Abe	US: Finding God in the Dark; Europe, Middle East, Africa/Asia/South Pacific: The Patriot: Shinzo Abe dreams of a more powerful, assertive Japan. Why that makes many people uncomfortable?
May 5/May 12	Beyoncé	The 100 Most Influential People
May 19	Vladimir Putin	~~Premier~~. ~~President~~. Czar. What Putin Wants.
May 26	US: A college pennant with "rape" written on it Europe, Middle East, Africa: Marine Le Pen; Asia/South Pacific: Li Na	US: The Crisis in Higher Education; Europe, Middle East, Africa: Plan of Attack: Can Marine Le Pen destroy the European Union from the inside? Asia/South Pacific: The Passion of Li Na: Why her greatest victory might have been against China's sport machine
June 2	US: Emalyn Aubrey Randolph; Europe, Middle East, Africa/Asia/South Pacific: Narendra Modi	US: Emalyn was due in June. She arrived in March. Saving Preemies; Europe, Middle East, Africa/Asia/South Pacific: 1.2 billion people await his next move: The outsized hopes-and fears-that accompany Narendra Modi, India's New Leader
June 9	US: Laverne Cox. The first "out" transgender person on the cover of Time; Europe, Middle East, Africa/Asia/South Pacific: A boy salvages what remains in his home in the Old City area of Homs, Syria	US: The Transgender Tipping Point: America's next civil rights frontier Europe, Middle East, Africa/Asia/South Pacific: The Unwinnable War: Why Syrians on both sides of the brutal civil war want a return to normal
June 16	Bowe Bergdahl	Was He Worth It?: The Cost of Bringing Sgt. Bergdahl Home.
June 23	Slice of butter	Eat Butter: Scientists labeled fat the enemy. Why they were wrong.
June 30	Map of the Middle East with Iraq burned out of the center	The End of Iraq
July 7/July 14	Model of a modern home	The Smarter Home: The dwellings of the future will make you calmer, safer, richer, and healthier – and they already exist.
July 21	Photo of hacker Aaron Portnoy from Exodus Intelligence along with illustration of lines of binary code	World War Zero: The global battle to steal your secrets is turning hackers into arms dealers
July 28	Bugs eat away at the white cover	Space Invaders: From Russian beetles to giant African snails, the U.S. is under assault – and it's costing us billions.
August 4	Vladimir Putin in the shadow of Malaysia Airlines Flight 17	Cold War II: The West is losing Putin's dangerous game
August 18	Middle aged man in shorts and socks	Manopause?!: Aging, insecurity, and the $2 billion testosterone industry
August 25	Robin Williams	Robin Williams: 1951–2014
September 1	US: Woman kneels in a street with her hands in the air amid tear gas Europe, Middle East, Africa/Asia/South Pacific: Inside the tunnel with lights	US: The Tragedy of Ferguson; Europe, Middle East, Africa/Asia/South Pacific: Fallout: How the Fukushima catastrophe has revealed the cracks in Japanese society
September 8/September 15	US/Asia: Numerous questions housed in colored bubbles Europe, Middle East, Africa/South Pacific: A blue background with flag of Scotland	US/Asia: The Answers Issue: Everything You Never Knew You Needed to Know; Europe, Middle East, Africa/South Pacific: EXIT: Why Scotland might quit the United Kingdom
September 22	Numerous Apple-style apps superimposed on a male arm	Never Offline.: The Apple Watch is just the start. How wearable tech will change your life – like it or not
September 29	US: Chad Stover; Europe, Middle East, Africa/Asia/South Pacific: U2	US: He died playing this game. Is football worth it? Europe, Middle East, Africa/Asia/South Pacific: The new U2: the veteran rock band faces the future
October 6	Mary Barra	The Mechanic: Recalling 30 million cars is only the beginning. CEO Mary Barra's plan to fix General Motors
October 13	US/Europe, Middle East, Africa: Man standing in hazmat protective gear Asia/South Pacific: Man holding 2 umbrellas during a tear gas fight	US/Europe, Middle East, Africa: Chasing Ebola; Asia/South Pacific: The Umbrella Revolution: Hong Kong's fight for freedom is a challenge to China
October 20	US/Europe, Middle East, Africa/South Pacific: A number of foods against a white background Asia: Joshua Wong	US/Europe, Middle East, Africa/South Pacific: How to Eat Now: The Truth About Home Cooking; Asia: The Face of Protest: Teenager Joshua Wong and the youth of Hong Kong are standing up for democracy. Can they win?
October 27	US/Europe, Middle East, Africa: Rand Paul; Asia/South Pacific: Joko Widodo	US/Europe, Middle East, Africa: The Most Interesting Man in Politics: The Reinventions of Rand Paul; Asia/South Pacific: A New Hope: Indonesian President Joko Widodo is a force of democracy
November 3	US: A judge's gavel coming down on an apple Europe, Middle East, Africa/Asia/South Pacific: A hand glove against a white background	US: Rotten Apples: It's nearly impossible to fire a bad teacher. Some tech millionaires may have found a way to change that Europe, Middle East, Africa/Asia/South Pacific: Stopping Ebola: The Risks and Realities of the Outbreak
November 10	Anne Hathaway, Matthew McConaughey, Christopher Nolan, and Jessica Chastain	Beyond the Stars: Director Christopher Nolan enlists science to explore the soul in Interstellar
November 17	US: Illustration of Mitch McConnell imitating the Barack Obama Hope poster Europe, Middle East, Africa/Asia/South Pacific: Xi Jinping	US: Change; Europe, Middle East, Africa/Asia/South Pacific: China's Leader Looms Large at Home and Abroad
November 24	Taylor Swift	The Power of Taylor Swift
December 1/December 7	Benedict Cumberbatch	The Genius Issue
December 15	Mark Zuckerberg	Half the World is Not Enough: Mark Zuckerberg's plan to get every human online
December 22/December 29	Ebola fighters	Person of the Year 2014
December 29/January 5, 2015	US: Scott Kelly; Europe, Middle East, Africa/Asia/South Pacific: Malecón, Havana	US: 2015: The Year Ahead; Europe, Middle East, Africa/Asia/South Pacific: Cuba: What the U.S. Decision Means for its Future

== 2015 ==
Date	Persons or topics	Caption
January 19	US: Surgical tray Europe, Middle East: Bullet hole in glass Africa/Asia/South Pacific: Kei Nishikori	US: What I Learned From My $190,000 Open-Heart Surgery: The surprising solution for fixing our health care system Europe, Middle East: Terror in France: Why Officials Feared an Attack was Coming; Africa/Asia/South Pacific: The Way of Kei: Japanese Tennis Star Kei Nishikori Takes on the World
January 26	A flame moves down a row of matches	After Paris: Lessons from the Attacks
February 2	A gas can pours gas within the red borders	Cheap Gas: How long can it last? How low will it go?
February 9	One line of people walks away from a car, while another walks towards it	Strangers Crashed My Car, Ate My Food, and Wore My Pants: Tales from the Sharing Economy
February 16	Howard Schultz	What Starbucks Knows About America
February 23/March 2	Baby	This Baby Could Live to Be 142 Years Old: Dispatches From the Frontiers of Longevity
March 9	Black ISIS mask on a red background	The ISIS Trap
March 16	George H. W. Bush, Jeb Bush, and George W. Bush, 1970	The Bush Identity: Where Jeb Fits in the Family Business
March 23	Silhouette of Hillary Clinton	The Clinton Way: They write their own rules. Will it work this time?
March 30	MaryAnn Anselmo and Marcia Stiefel, women with brain tumors	Closing the Cancer Gap
April 6	Street scene in Cuba	Cuba: What Will Change When the Americans Arrive
April 13	LGBT flag with a cross cut out	Freedom Fight
April 20	Video stills from Shooting of Walter Scott	Black Lives Matter. This time the charge is murder.
April 27/May 4	Bradley Cooper, Misty Copeland, Ruth Bader Ginsburg, Jorge Ramos, Kanye West	The 100 Most Influential People
May 11	Man running from line of police during 2015 Baltimore riots	America, ~~1968~~ 2015. What has changed. What hasn't.
May 18	Narendra Modi	Why Modi Matters: The world needs India to step up as a global power. One year in, can Narendra Modi deliver?
May 25	Mouse smoking marijuana	The Highly Divisive, Curiously Underfunded, and Strangely Promising World of Pot Science
June 1	Empty beach	Who Killed Summer Vacation?
June 8	Empty electric chair	The Last Execution: Why the era of capital punishment is ending
June 15	Painkiller on a hook	They're the most powerful painkillers even invented. And they're creating the worst addiction crisis America has ever seen.
June 22	XQ test sheet laying on top of a man	How High Is Your XQ? Your next job might depend on it.
June 29	Gloved hands approaching a woman's face with surgical tools	Nip. Tuck. Or Else. Now everybody gets work done. Will you?
July 6/July 13	Graphic of different questions in colored boxes	The Answers Issue
July 20	Elizabeth Warren	Who's Afraid of Elizabeth Warren?
July 27	Atom symbol with Barack Obama, Hassan Rouhani, a nuclear launch, and one of the 1979–1981 Iranian hostages in the orbitals	Iran: Tehran's New Power/Why It's a Good Deal
August 3	George W. Bush and Bill Clinton	Game of Thrones: Time talks 2016 with the most surprising couple in politics
August 17	Palmer Luckey wearing an Oculus Rift, superimposed over a photo of a tropical beach	The Surprising Joy of Virtual Reality
August 24	Philadelphia Police Department officers Sean Devlin and Mischel Matos on patrol	What It's Like to Be a Cop in America: One Year After Ferguson
August 31	Donald Trump	Deal With It
September 7/September 14	Stephen Colbert	Colbert...As You've Never Seen Him
September 21	Question marks pop out of a red background	The Question Everything Issue
September 28	Bernie Sanders	Bernie
October 5	Pope Francis	Pope Francis Meets America
October 12	Woman performing a breast self-examination	"What if I decide to just do nothing?" – breast cancer's new frontier
October 19	Refugees cross from Serbia into Croatia	Special Report: Exodus – The Epic Migration to Europe & What Lies Ahead
October 26	Smoke after jets strike the town of Daret Ezza	Russia just wants to be friends
November 2	Illustration of fusion	Fusion: Unlimited energy. For everyone. Forever. It might actually work this time.
November 9	Bacon arranged in an X	The War on Delicious
November 16	Iranian woman	Iran 2025: How its next decade will change the world
November 23	Emanuel African Methodist Episcopal Church	What It Takes To Forgive a Killer
November 30/December 7	The Eiffel Tower (replacing the I in TIME) casts a large shadow	World War ISIS
December 14	BB-8/R2-D2 (two covers)	The Genius of Star Wars
December 21	Angela Merkel	Person of the Year 2015
December 28/January 4, 2016	Adele	The Year Ahead

== 2016 ==
Date	Persons or topics	Caption
January 18	Donald Trump speaking at rally	How Trump Won: Now he just needs the votes
January 25	US: David Bowie; Europe, Middle East, Africa/Asia/South Pacific: Downward sloping line and arrow with "Made in China" tag	US: David Bowie: 1947–2016; Europe, Middle East, Africa/Asia/South Pacific: The Next Recession & Where to Hide
February 1	US: Sick child Europe, Middle East, Africa/Asia/South Pacific: Protesters at a rally of the Pegida movement, Dresden, Germany	US: The Poisoning of an American City: Toxic water. Sick kids. And the incompetent leaders who betrayed Flint; Europe, Middle East, Africa/Asia/South Pacific: Unwelcome: After the Cologne attacks, will Germany close its doors to refugees?
February 8	Barbie doll	"Now Can We Stop Talking About My Body?": What Barbie's new shape says about American beauty
February 15	Hillary Clinton	"I know what it's like to be knocked down": A conversation with Hillary Clinton
February 22/February 29	Silhouetted woman takes blue pill	The Longevity Issue
March 7	Top-down view of car with empty driver's seat	No traffic. No accidents. No deaths. All you have to do is give up your right to drive.
March 14	Donald Trump with checklist over face	On the plane with Donald Trump
March 21	Nancy and Ronald Reagan at the 1976 Republican National Convention	What Happened to this Party?
March 28	Tim Cook	Apple CEO Tim Cook on his fight with the FBI and why he won't back down
April 4	US: IV drip Europe, Middle East, Africa/Asia/South Pacific: Passengers evacuated after bombing of Maalbeek metro station in Brussels	US: What if your immune system could be taught to kill cancer? Europe, Middle East, Africa/Asia/South Pacific: Under Siege
April 11	US: Blurred images of naked women Europe, Middle East, Africa/Asia/South Pacific: Xi Jinping peeling away to reveal Mao Zedong	US: Porn: Why young men who grew up with Internet porn are becoming advocates for turning it off Europe, Middle East, Africa/Asia/South Pacific: Chairman Xi
April 18	Ted Cruz	Likable Enough?
April 25	Notice in style of bill informing readers they owe $42,998.12 of national debt	Make America Solvent Again
May 2/May 9	Leonardo DiCaprio, Nicki Minaj, Priscilla Chan, Mark Zuckerberg, Christine Lagarde, Lin-Manuel Miranda, Priyanka Chopra	The 100 Most Influential People
May 16	Mosquito	The Zika Virus
May 23	One-dollar bill covered with multiple leaves	Capitalism: The markets are choking our economy. How to save it.
May 30	Six rolls of toilet paper, one for each color of the rainbow	Battle of the Bathroom
June 6	Bernie Sanders speaks at a Santa Monica rally	How Far Will Bernie Go?
June 13	Wedding rings locked together by heart-shaped lock	How To Stay Married (And Why)
June 20	Muhammad Ali	The Greatest – Muhammad Ali: 1942–2016
June 27	List of Orlando nightclub shooting victims on black background	Why Did They Die?
July 4	US: Scrambled picture of a baby Europe, Middle East, Africa/Asia/South Pacific: Kurdish soldier looking out over Mosul	US: The Gene Machine: What the CRISPR experiments mean for humanity Europe, Middle East, Africa/Asia/South Pacific: Iraq's Forever War: On the front lines of the fight against ISIS
July 11/July 18	US: Patriotic illustration and list of reasons Europe, Middle East, Africa/Asia/South Pacific: Domino with European Union Flag falls	US: 240 Reasons To Celebrate America Right Now; Europe, Middle East, Africa/Asia/South Pacific: Europe's Crisis of Faith: Why Brexit is just the beginning
July 25	The back of Donald Trump's head in a chair labeled "Mr. President: January 20, 2017"	Gut Check: For Donald Trump, intuition beats experience. What that would mean for the U.S. presidency
August 1	Various images of Hillary Clinton	In Search of Hillary
August 9	Simone Biles	The Games Changer: U.S. gymnast Simone Biles is pushing the limits of her sport.
August 22	Illustration of Donald Trump's face melting	Meltdown
August 29	Troll typing on a laptop	Why we're losing the Internet to the culture of hate
September 5	Family holding hands on a hilltop	Ordinary Families. Extraordinary Kids. A story of nine families.
September 12/September 19	Time-lapse photo of a person jump-roping	The Exercise Cure: The surprising science of a life-changing workout
September 26	Heads and names of Samantha Bee, Stephen Colbert, Jimmy Kimmel, Seth Meyers, Trevor Noah, and John Oliver in the style of political convention state signs	We Joke. You Decide. The seriously partisan politics of late-night comedy.
October 3	Colin Kaepernick kneeling	The Perilous Fight
October 10	Vladimir Putin with an "I Voted" sticker	Russia wants to undermine faith in the U.S. election. Don't fall for it.
October 17	Members of Syrian Civil Defense moving into a wall of smoke	"Whoever saves one life, saves all of humanity." – The White Helmets of Syria and the 60,000 lives they've saved.
October 24	Same illustration of Donald Trump's face from Aug 22 issue, but now melted farther into a puddle	Total Meltdown
October 31	Gretchen Carlson	Gretchen Carlson wants to change the way women fight sexual harassment
November 7	Faith-Ann Bishop, 20	Anxiety, Depression, and the American Adolescent
November 14	Donald Trump and Hillary Clinton holding a sign that reads "The End is Near"	The End is Near
November 21	Donald Trump and Mike Pence during Trump's victory speech	Donald Trump, President-elect. November 9, 2016.
November 28/December 5	Illustration of camera shutter	The Most Influential Photos of All Time
December 12	Fidel Castro	After Fidel
December 19	Donald Trump	Person of the Year 2016. President of the Divided States of America.
December 26/January 2, 2017	Babies born in Syrian refugee camps	The Year Ahead

== 2017 ==
Date	Persons or topics	Caption
January 16	Swiss Army knife with three Botox injectors	How Botox Became the Drug That's Treating Everything
January 23	Helicopter flying towards White House	Incoming: A Survival Guide to the White House from Team Obama to Team Trump
January 30	Donald Trump speaking at his inauguration	Donald Trump: 45th President of the United States
February 6	Pink hat worn at 2017 Women's March	The Resistance Rises: How a march becomes a movement
February 13	Steve Bannon	The Great Manipulator
February 20	Chuck Schumer	Do the Democrats Matter?
February 27/March 6	Donald Trump sitting at his desk amidst a storm	Nothing to See Here
March 13	Snapchat CEO Evan Spiegel	What's It Worth to Be Yourself Online? The Genius of Snapchat
March 20	Donald Trump texting next to a falling Washington Monument	Trump's War on Washington
March 27	A transgender person	Beyond He or She: How a new generation is redefining the meaning of gender
April 3	None	Is Truth Dead?
April 10	Various modes of transportation	Dear Washington, We need to rebuild. Can you get your act together?
April 17	ISIS mask	The Uranium Underworld
April 24	Sheryl Sandberg	Let's Talk About Grief: An unlikely new mission for Sheryl Sandberg
May 1/May 8	Riz Ahmed, Jeff Bezos, Viola Davis, Melinda Gates, and John Legend	The 100 Most Influential People
May 15	Ebola virus under a microscope	Warning: We are not ready for the next pandemic
May 22	Donald Trump walking through the White House	The Firing of James Comey/After Hours in the White House
May 29	The White House and Basil Cathedral	No Caption (As the viewer pans from left to right, the White House morphs into Basil Cathedral.)
June 5	The cover, with white background, tries to trim its size with a fabric tape measure.	The Weight Loss Trap. Low Carb, Low Fat, Paleo, Vegan, Flexitarian. Why Your Diet isn't Working.
June 12	White House Senior Advisor Jared Kushner	The Good Son; The Trials of Jared Kushner
June 19	Image from the bar at the Trump International Hotel (Washington D.C.)	The Swamp Hotel: How Trump's D.C. outpost became a dealmaker's paradise for diplomats, lobbyists and insiders
June 26	Image of a smartphone screen depicting the Uber app with a number of cars in a multi-car pileup over the Uber headquarters	Uber fail: Upheaval at the world's most valuable startup is a wake-up call for Silicon Valley
July 3	Former FBI director and new special counsel Robert Mueller	The Lie Detector: Someone's not telling the truth
July 10	Kit Harington, Nikolaj Coster-Waldau, Emilia Clarke, Peter Dinklage, Lena Headey, and a dog	Game of Thrones: Inside the World's Most Popular Show
July 24	Donald Trump Jr.	Red Handed: The Russia Scandal Hits Home
July 31	A mosaic of greyscale figures in the shape of Vladimir Putin's face	The Secret Plan To Stop Putin's Election Plot
August 7	A wave about to crash on a beach	The Anti Antidepressant: Depression afflicts 300 million people. One-third don't respond to treatment. A surprising new drug may change that
August 21	General John Kelly, White House Chief of Staff for U.S. President Donald Trump	General John Kelly: Trump's last best hope
August 28	A cartoon of a person wearing a U.S. flag and making a Nazi salute	Hate in America
September 4	Joey Erace, 10-year-old baseball player	Crazy Travel. Crazy Costs. Crazy Stress. How kid sports turned pro
September 18	Various covers, including Hillary Rodham Clinton, Selena Gomez, Oprah Winfrey, Ellen DeGeneres, Ilhan Omar and more.	Firsts: Women who are changing the world
September 25	Hurricane Irma	The storms keep getting stronger. And so do we
October 2	A figure of Republican holding the Democratic's logo	Shrunk
October 9	An American football player tackling a practice dummy in the image of President Trump	Why he always bounces back
October 16	List of places of mass shootings	Las Vegas – America's nightmare
October 23	US: Harvey Weinstein; Non-US editions: John Boyega	US: Producer. Predator. Pariah. Non-US editions: Next generation leaders
October 30		The goddess myth
November 6		US: The Wrecking Crew; Non-US editions: The Caliphate Falls
November 13		US, Europe, Middle East: Mueller's Most Wanted; Asia Pacific: China won
November 20	Emmanuel Macron	The Next Leader of Europe
November 27		The 25 Best Inventions of 2017
December 18	Ashley Judd, Susan Fowler, Adama Iwu, Taylor Swift, and Isabel Pascual	Person of the Year 2017. The Silence Breakers.

== 2018 ==
Date	Persons or topics	Caption
January 15	Mohamed Nasir	The Optimists: Edited by Bill Gates
January 22	Illustration of Donald Trump	Year One
January 29	50 women who chose to run for public office in the United States after the 2017 Women's March	The Avengers
February 5		America Alone
February 12		Making America Nuclear Again
February 19	Chadwick Boseman	A Hero Rises
February 26		How to Live Longer Better (And Still Have Fun)
March 5		The Opioid Diaries
March 12	Greta Gerwig	Lights. Camera. Power.
March 19	Immigrants	Ripped Apart
April 2	X González, Jaclyn Corin, David Hogg, Cameron Kasky, and Alex Wind.	Enough.
April 9	Jeff Sessions	Nobody's Above the Law
April 16	Mohammad bin Salman	Charm Offensive
April 23	Illustration of Donald Trump	Stormy
April 30	Jennifer Lopez, Tiffany Haddish, Roger Federer, Satya Nadella, Nicole Kidman, Tarana Burke	The 100 Most Influential People
May 14	A damaged FBI badge	The FBI in Crisis
May 21		Can Bad Men Change?
May 28		How my Generation Broke America
June 4	Duke and Duchess of Sussex	The Modern Royals
June 11		The Drone Age
June 18	Illustration of Donald Trump	King Me.
June 25	Kim Jong-un and Donald Trump	The Riskiest Show on Earth
July 2	Donald Trump with a child	Welcome to America.
July 9	Supreme Court of the United States	It's Trump's court now
July 23	Illustration of the word Democracy	Why it will prevail
July 30	Donald Trump	The summit crisis
August 6	Stacey Abrams	Loving a place that doesn't love you
August 20	Spike Lee	Spike Lee's long game
August 27	Serena Williams	Perfectly Serena
September 3	Illustration of Donald Trump	In Deep.
September 17	Nancy Pelosi	The persistence of Nancy Pelosi
September 24	Hope Brown	I'm a teacher in America
October 1	Brett Kavanaugh	What's changed
October 8	United States Declaration of Independence	Can we get there?
October 15	Illustration of Christine Blasey Ford	Her lasting impact
October 22	Donald Trump	How Trumpism outlasts Trump
October 29		The Wave Makers
November 5		Guns in America
November 12		Beyond Hate
November 19		Redder. Bluer. Trumpier.
November 26		Who gets to be American?
December 10	Seven parents of seven dead students	The world moves on and you don't
December 17	George H. W. Bush	The Bush Legacy
December 24		The Guardians and the war on truth

== 2019 ==
Date	Persons or topics	Caption
January 14		The Future of Babies
January 21	Illustration of Nancy Pelosi and Donald Trump	The Art of the Duel
January 28		I helped create this mess. Here's how to fix it
February 4	Different photos of new immigrants on various covers of the magazine discussing global immigration issues	Beyond walls
February 18	Cicely Tyson	The Art of Optimism
March 4	Illustration of Donald Trump and other politicians	Knock, knock...
March 11	Julia Louis-Dreyfus	The triumph of Julia Louis-Dreyfus
March 18	Tenzin Gyatso (14th Dalai Lama)	The Survivor
March 25	Donald Trump as a peach	Do they dare?
April 1	Alexandria Ocasio-Cortez	The Phenom
April 8	Donald Trump	Just Singin'
April 15	Joe Biden	The Test Case
April 22	Flag of Europe	The Unraveling of Europe
April 29	Taylor Swift, Dwayne Johnson, Sandra Oh, Gayle King, Nancy Pelosi, Mohamed Salah	The 100 Most Influential People
May 13	Chasten and Pete Buttigieg	First Family
May 20	Elizabeth Warren	I have a plan for that
May 27	Greta Thunberg	Next Generation Leaders
June 3	Alex Morgan	The Equalizer
June 17	Bernie Sanders	Building a Better Bernie
June 24	António Guterres	Our Sinking Planet
July 1	Donald Trump	My whole life is a bet
July 8	Colson Whitehead	America's Storyteller
July 22	Benjamin Netanyahu	The Strong Survive
July 29	Illustration of astronauts	The Next Space Race
August 5	Illustration of politicians	Whose party is it?
August 19	Place names of mass shootings in America	Enough.
August 26	Lil Nas X	It's his country
September 2		The Left Behind Economy
September 16	Ryan Murphy, Margaret Atwood and Michael B. Jordan	The Best of Fall
September 23	Sand sculpture	2050: How Earth Survived
September 30	Man vaping	The New American Addiction
October 7	Illustration of Donald Trump	
October 14	Kamala Harris	Her Case
October 21	Matthew Poblano, Gregory Grammer and Ashley Luna Gorbea	America's Forever War
November 4	A robot	The robot will see you now
November 11	Rudy Giuliani	The Secretary of Defense
November 14	Camila Cabello, Awkwafina, Zion Williamson, Chanel Miller, Carlos Alvarado Quesada and Emily Weiss	The Next 100 Most Influential People
November 18		America on Trial
December 2	Balloons spelling out the word 'elite'	Party's Over
December 16	Donald Trump	Quid Pro Dough
December 23	Greta Thunberg	Person of the Year

Previous	Lists of covers of Time magazine	Next
2000s	2010s	2020s
