= Lists of covers of Time magazine =

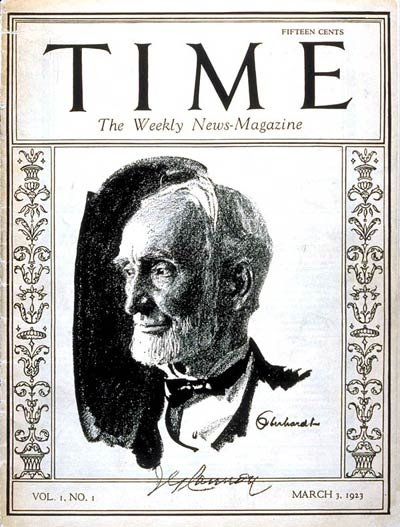

Lists of covers of Time magazine list the people or topics on the cover of Time magazine. Time was first published in 1923. As Time became established as one of the United States' leading news magazines, an appearance on the cover of Time became an indicator of notability, fame or notoriety. The lists are organized by decade.

== Lists ==
- 1923–1929
- 1930–1939
- 1940–1949
- 1950–1959
- 1960–1969
- 1970–1979
- 1980–1989
- 1990–1999
- 2000–2009
- 2010–2019
- 2020–2029
