= List of covers of Time magazine (1980s) =

This is a list of people and subjects appearing on the cover of Time magazine in the 1980s. Time was first published in 1923. As Time became established as one of the United States' leading news magazines, an appearance on the cover of Time became an indicator of notability, fame or notoriety. Such features were accompanied by articles.

For other decades, see Lists of covers of Time magazine.

== 1980 ==
- January 7 – Ayatollah Khomeini, Man of the Year
- January 14 – Moscow's Bold Challenge
- January 21 – Grain as a Weapon: Who Wins, Who Loses
- January 28 – Squeezing the Soviets
- February 4 – Jimmy Carter
- February 11 – Eric and Beth Heiden
- February 18 – Operation Abscam: The FBI Stings Congress
- February 25 – Dan Rather
- March 3 – Peter Sellers
- March 10 – Ronald Reagan
- March 17 – Diplomacy In Crisis: Hostages in Bogotá, Suspense In Iran, Fiasco at the U.N.
- March 24 – Jimmy Carter
- March 31 – Interferon: The IF Drug for Cancer
- April 7 – T. A. Wilson
- April 14 – The Palestinians
- April 21 – Is Capitalism Working?
- April 28 – Jimmy Carter
- May 5 – Jimmy Carter
- May 12 – Edmund Muskie
- May 19 – Darth Vader (The Empire Strikes Back)
- May 26 – Picasso
- June 2 – The Big Blowup (Mount St. Helens)
- June 9 – Who'll Fight for America? The manpower Crisis
- June 16 – Help! Teacher Can't Teach
- June 23 – Inside the U.S.S.R.
- June 30 – Björn Borg (Wimbledon Championships)
- July 7 – Rediscovering America
- July 14 – That Aching Back
- July 21 – Feeling Super in Detroit (G.O.P. Convention)
- July 28 – Ronald Reagan & George H. W. Bush
- August 4 – Billy Carter
- August 11 – Larry Hagman as J. R. (Dallas)
- August 18 – Jimmy Carter
- August 25 – Jimmy Carter
- September 1 – Poland's Angry Workers
- September 8 – Thomas Murphy, Philip Caldwell & Lee Iacocca
- September 15 – The U.S. Voter
- September 22 – Poisoning of America: Those Toxic Chemical Wastes
- September 29 – Bear Bryant
- October 6 – War in the Gulf (Iran–Iraq War)
- October 13 – Jimmy Carter & Ronald Reagan
- October 20 – Carl Sagan
- October 27 – The Gulf: Will It Explode?
- November 3 – Jimmy Carter & Ronald Reagan
- November 10 – The Hostage Drama
- November 17 – Ronald Reagan
- November 24 – Saturn: Encounter in Space
- December 1 – Jane Pauley, Gene Shalit, Willard Scott, Tom Brokaw, David Hartman, Charles Kuralt & Joan Lunden
- December 8 – The Robot Revolution
- December 15 – Rocky Mountain High
- December 22 – John Lennon
- December 29 – Lech Wałęsa

== 1981 ==
- January 5 – Ronald Reagan, Man of the Year
- January 12 – Aiming High: Space Shuttle Columbia
- January 19 – Reagan's Biggest Challenge: Mending the Economy
- January 26 – The Hostages: Breakthrough
- February 2 – The Ordeal Ends: And the Outrage Grows
- February 9 – Brooke Shields
- February 16 – Margaret Thatcher
- February 23 – American Renewal
- March 2 – The Ax Falls: Reagan's Plan for a "New Beginning"
- March 9 – Herbert Boyer
- March 16 – Alexander Haig
- March 23 – The Curse of Violent Crime
- March 30 – How Japan Does It: The World's Toughest Competitor
- April 6 – Abortion: The Battle of Life vs "Choice"
- April 13 – Ronald Reagan
- April 20 – Lady Diana
- April 27 – Right On: Winging Into New Era (first orbital flight of NASA Space Shuttle Program)
- May 4 – The Money Chase: What Business Schools Are Doing To Us
- May 11 – Billy Martin
- May 18 – Menachem Begin and Shimon Peres
- May 25 – Terrorist's Target: Why Did They Do It? (Pope John Paul II assassination attempt)
- June 1 – Heart Attacks: New Insights, New Treatments
- June 8 – The Savings Revolution: Everybody wants Your Money
- June 15 – Ed Koch
- June 22 – Attack—and Fallout: The Target: Iraq's Reactor
- June 29 – François Mitterrand
- July 6 – High on Cocaine: A Drug with Status and Menace
- July 13 – Viet Nam Vets: Fighting for their Rights
- July 20 – Sandra Day O'Connor
- July 27 – Caspar Weinberger
- August 3 – Charles, Prince of Wales & Lady Diana Spencer (wedding)
- August 10 – Ice Cream: Getting Your Licks
- August 17 – Winging It: Coping Without Controllers
- August 24 – James Rouse
- August 31 – John Irving
- September 7 – Meryl Streep
- September 14 – Jesse Helms
- September 21 – Ronald Reagan
- September 28 – We, the Jury
- October 5 – Dickens' Nicholas Nickelby cast
- October 12 – No Free Lunch: Cost of Entitlements
- October 19 – Anwar Sadat
- October 26 – Arming the World: What Are the Limits
- November 2 – The Fitness Craze: America Shapes Up
- November 9 – Ronald Reagan
- November 16 – Katharine Hepburn & Henry Fonda (On Golden Pond)
- November 23 – Paradise Lost? South Florida
- November 30 – Europe's Fear and a Bold U.S. Proposal (Peace demonstrator in West Germany)
- December 7 – Cats (a white cat)
- December 14 – The President's Men: How the White House Works—And Doesn't
- December 21 – Muammar Gaddafi
- December 28 – Wojciech Jaruzelski

== 1982 ==
- January 4 – Lech Wałęsa, Man of the Year
- January 11 – Patrick Teer, Children of War: Out of the Horror, Amazing Strength
- January 18 – Gronk! Flash! Zap!: Video Games Are Blitzing the World
- January 25 – Joe Montana
- February 1 – Franklin D. Roosevelt
- February 8 – Unemployment: the Biggest Worry
- February 15 – Steven Jobs
- February 22 – Jaclyn Smith
- March 1 – Henry Kissinger
- March 8 – Paul Volcker
- March 15 – Salt: A New Villain?
- March 22 – Central America: Gunship over El Salvador
- March 29 – Rising fears about Nuclear War
- April 5 – Giorgio Armani
- April 12 – Jerusalem
- April 19 – Falklands Crisis
- April 26 – Howard Baker
- May 3 – Computer Kids
- May 10 – Falklands War
- May 17 – H.M.S. Sheffield
- May 24 – Social Security
- May 31 – Falklands D-Day
- June 7 – Falklands, Pope John Paul II & Ronald Reagan
- June 14 – Gerry Cooney & Sylvester Stallone (Rocky III)
- June 21 – Israel's Blitz
- June 28 – Spoils of War (Lebanese civilians amid the bombing of West Beirut)
- July 5 – George Shultz
- July 12 – American Women
- July 19 – Siege of Beirut
- July 26 – Ayatullah Khomeini
- August 2 – Herpes
- August 9 – Ted Turner
- August 16 – Destroying Beirut: Israel tightens the noose
- August 23 – James G. Watt
- August 30 – Women & Fitness
- September 6 – Bull market
- September 13 – The Inmate Nation
- September 20 – Menachem Begin
- September 27 – Lebanon Massacre
- October 4 – Ariel Sharon
- October 11 – Jimmy Carter
- October 18 – John Updike
- October 25 – Pac Men
- November 1 – John DeLorean
- November 8 – Catalogues
- November 15 – Election Results
- November 22 – Yuri Andropov
- November 29 – Joseph Bernardin
- December 6 – Paul Newman
- December 13 – Ronald Reagan
- December 20 – Miguel de la Madrid
- December 27 – Missionaries (protestant Leon Dillinger in Papua New Guinea)

== 1983 ==
- January 3 – The Computer, Machine of the Year
- January 10 – The debt-bomb: The worldwide Peril of go-go Lending
- January 17 – James Levine
- January 24 – The Death Penalty
- January 31 – Pershing II
- February 7 – Robert Mitchum
- February 14 – KGB
- February 21 – Menachem Begin & Ariel Sharon
- February 28 – Princess Diana
- March 7 – Franklin C. Spinney
- March 14 – Pope John Paul II
- March 21 – Lee Iacocca
- March 28 – Tax Fraud
- April 4 – Ronald Reagan
- April 11 – Battling Cocaine's Grip
- April 18 – Arms Control: Making the wrong moves?
- April 25 – Claude Pepper
- May 2 – Nastassja Kinski
- May 9 – Reagan & Central America
- May 16 – Hitler's Forged Diaries
- May 23 – George Lucas (Return of the Jedi)
- May 30 – The New Economy
- June 6 – Cures for Stress
- June 13 – Los Angeles
- June 20 – Margaret Thatcher
- June 27 – Pope John Paul II
- July 4 – AIDS Hysteria
- July 11 – IBM's John R. Opel
- July 18 – David Bowie
- July 25 – Americans on the Move
- August 1 – Special Issue: Japan
- August 8 – William P. Clark
- August 15 – Lisa Harap – Babies. What Do They Know? When Do They Know It?
- August 22 – Jesse Jackson
- August 29 – Daredevil Ben Colli
- September 5 – Domestic Violence
- September 12 – Soviets Destroy Airliner
- September 19 – Reagan & U.N. Quiz Moscow
- September 26 – Deng Xiaoping (Theodore H. White on China: Banishing Mao's ghost)
- October 3 – Marines in Lebanon
- October 5 – 60th Anniversary Issue
- October 10 – America's Schools
- October 17 – Peter Ueberroth
- October 24 – Ronald Reagan
- October 31 – Marines in Beirut
- November 7 – Grenada and Beirut
- November 14 – John F. Kennedy
- November 21 – Splitting AT&T
- November 28 – George Orwell
- December 5 – Arms Control (Soviet walkout of the INF Treaty talks)
- December 12 – The Press Under Fire
- December 19 – Hafez al-Assad
- December 26 – Music Videos

== 1984 ==
- January 2 – Ronald Reagan & Yuri Andropov, Men of the Year
- January 9 – Pope John Paul II & Mehmet Ali Ağca
- January 16 – Africa's Troubles
- January 23 – Arthur Rock
- January 30 – Phil Mahre & Tamara McKinney
- February 6 – Ronald Reagan
- February 13 – Seabrook Nuclear Plant
- February 20 – Yuri Andropov
- February 27 – Konstantin Chernenko
- March 5 – Martin Feldstein
- March 12 – Gary Hart, Walter Mondale & John Glenn
- March 19 – Michael Jackson
- March 26 – Cholesterol
- April 2 – Alexander Haig
- April 9 – End of the Sexual Revolution
- April 16 – Bill Gates
- April 23 – Mining Nicaragua's harbors: Policy collision
- April 30 – China's New Face (Chinese man with a Coca-Cola bottle)
- May 7 – Jesse Jackson
- May 14 – Shirley MacLaine
- May 21 – Olympic Turmoil
- May 28 – D-Day Remembered
- June 4 – Geraldine Ferraro & Dianne Feinstein
- June 11 – Mystery Behind Pain
- June 18 – Walter Mondale
- June 25 – Andrei A. Gromyko
- July 2 – Erma Bombeck
- July 9 – Shimon Peres & Yitzhak Shamir
- July 16 – Democrats Launch Campaign
- July 23 – Geraldine Ferraro (vice presidential selection)
- July 30 – Carl Lewis (1984 Summer Olympics)
- August 6 – Mexico City
- August 13 – Carl Lewis
- August 20 – Sears & Cheryl Tiegs
- August 27 – Ronald Reagan & George H. W. Bush
- September 3 – Geraldine Ferraro
- September 10 – Science of Conception
- September 17 – Brian Mulroney
- September 24 – America's Upbeat Mood
- October 1 – Andrei A. Gromyko
- October 8 – The Supreme Court (Warren E. Burger, John Paul Stevens, Lewis F. Powell Jr., William Rehnquist, Sandra Day O'Connor, Thurgood Marshall, William J. Brennan Jr., Byron White & Harry Blackmun)
- October 15 – Crackdown on the Mafia
- October 22 – Ronald Reagan, George H. W. Bush, Walter Mondale & Geraldine Ferraro
- October 29 – Ronald Reagan & Walter Mondale
- November 5 – New Concern with Civility
- November 12 – Indira Gandhi
- November 19 – Ronald Reagan
- November 26 – Astronauts Rescue Satellite
- December 3 – America's Banks
- December 10 – William DeVries
- December 17 – Disaster Strikes Bhopal
- December 24 – Video Cassette Recorders
- December 31 – David Lean

== 1985 ==
- January 7 – Peter Ueberroth, Man of the Year
- January 14 – Nancy Reagan
- January 21 – Donald Regan
- January 28 – Ronald Reagan's Second Term
- February 4 – Pope John Paul II
- February 11 – Soviet Defector Tells All
- February 18 – Failing Farms
- February 25 – Cocaine Wars
- March 4 – T. Boone Pickens
- March 11 – Star Wars program
- March 18 – Larry Bird & Wayne Gretzky
- March 25 – Mikhail Gorbachev
- April 1 – Lee Iacocca
- April 8 – Bernhard Goetz
- April 15 – Vietnam, a Decade Later
- April 22 – U.S. Tourists
- April 29 – V. E. Day: 40th Anniversary
- May 6 – New Theory on Dinosaurs
- May 13 – Ronald Reagan
- May 20 – New Drinking Habits
- May 27 – Madonna
- June 3 – Nuclear Threat
- June 10 – Ronald Reagan's Tax Package
- June 17 – Spy Scandal Grows
- June 24 – Hijacked: TWA Flight 847
- July 1 – Terrorism (Captain John Testrake & a hijacker)
- July 8 – Special Issue: Immigrants
- July 15 – Steven Spielberg
- July 22 – Ronald Reagan Enters Hospital
- July 29 – Hiroshima
- August 5 – South Africa
- August 12 – Growing Threat of AIDS
- August 19 – Pete Rose
- August 26 – American Food
- September 2 – Jerry Falwell
- September 9 – Mikhail Gorbachev
- September 16 – Philip Michael Thomas & Don Johnson
- September 23 – Deng Xiaoping
- September 30 – Earthquake Shatters Mexico
- October 7 – Trade Wars: Congress v. Ronald Reagan
- October 14 – Toxic Waste
- October 21 – U.S. Strikes Back at Terrorism (Achille Lauro hijacking)
- October 28 – Ronald Reagan, Hosni Mubarak, Bettino Craxi & Yasser Arafat
- November 4 – Garrison Keillor
- November 11 – Prince Charles & Princess Diana
- November 18 – Ronald Reagan & Mikhail Gorbachev
- November 25 – Volcano Strikes Colombia
- December 2 – Ronald Reagan & Mikhail Gorbachev
- December 9 – Teenage Pregnancy
- December 16 – Halley's Comet
- December 23 – Corporate Mergers
- December 30 – Christmas in Brooklyn

== 1986 ==
- January 6 – Deng Xiaoping, Man of the Year
- January 13 – Donald Burr
- January 20 – Shedding Weight
- January 27 – William Perry & Walter Payton
- February 3 – Corazon Aquino & Ferdinand Marcos
- February 10 – Challenger Explodes
- February 17 – Pat Robertson
- February 24 – Corazon Aquino
- March 3 – Michael Deaver
- March 10 – Corazon Aquino & Salvador Laurel
- March 17 – Drugs at Work
- March 24 – Insurance
- March 31 – Daniel Ortega
- April 7 – Dwight Gooden
- April 14 – Cheap Oil
- April 21 – Muammar Gaddafi
- April 28 – Tripoli Under Attack
- May 5 – Vladimir Horowitz
- May 12 – Chernobyl Reactor
- May 19 – Baby Boomers
- May 26 – Molly Ringwald
- June 2 – Mario Cuomo
- June 9 – Fixing NASA (Grounded Space Shuttle Atlantis)
- June 16 – Special Issue: Best of America
- June 23 – Star Wars program
- June 30 – William Rehnquist
- July 7 – Ronald Reagan
- July 14 – Statue of Liberty
- July 21 – Fighting Pornography
- July 28 – Sigourney Weaver (Aliens)
- August 4 – Sanctions against South Africa
- August 11 – Alvin Explores Titanic
- August 18 – Andrew Wyeth's 'Helga'
- August 25 – Tax Reform
- September 1 – Ralph Lauren
- September 8 – Derek Bok
- September 15 – Crusade Against Drugs
- September 22 – Laurence Tisch
- September 29 – John Gotti
- October 6 – Stephen King
- October 13 – Summit in Iceland
- October 20 – Ronald Reagan & Mikhail Gorbachev
- October 27 – David Byrne
- November 3 – Viruses
- November 10 – High-Tech Wall Street
- November 17 – Ronald Reagan's Secret Dealings With Iran (Akbar Hashemi Rafsanjani)
- November 24 – Sex Education
- December 1 – Ivan Boesky
- December 8 – Iran Arms Sales
- December 15 – Neil Simon
- December 22 – Oliver North
- December 29 – Letter to the Year 2086

== 1987 ==
- January 5 – Corazon Aquino, Woman of the Year
- January 12 – Air Travel
- January 19 – Adnan Khashoggi
- January 26 – Oliver Stone's Platoon (Willem Dafoe, Charlie Sheen & Tom Berenger)
- February 2 – The American Consumer
- February 9 – Dennis Conner
- February 16 – Homosexuals & AIDS
- February 23 – African Wildlife
- March 2 – Bette Midler
- March 9 – Ronald Reagan
- March 16 – Howard Baker, William Webster & Frank Carlucci
- March 23 – The Nature of the Universe (SN 1987A supernova)
- March 30 – America's Agenda after Reagan
- April 6 – Jimmy Swaggart and Jim & Tammy Bakkers
- April 13 – U.S. & Japan Face Off
- April 20 – Espionage Scandals
- April 27 – U2 (The Edge, Adam Clayton, Bono & Larry Mullen Jr.)
- May 4 – South Africa
- May 11 – Superconductors
- May 18 – Gary Hart & Donna Rice
- May 25 – America's Moral Bearings
- June 1 – The U.S.S. Stark
- June 8 – A Memoir of the Cultural Revolution
- June 15 – Alan Greenspan
- June 22 – Child Care
- June 29 – Chun Doo Hwan
- July 6 – Special Issue: Constitution at 200
- July 13 – Oliver North
- July 20 – Oliver North
- July 27 – Mikhail Gorbachev
- August 3 – The Bakkers' Empire
- August 10 – America's Vanishing Coastline
- August 17 – Ayatullah Khomeini
- August 24 – Steve Martin
- August 31 – Asian-American Whiz Kids
- September 7 – U.S. Catholics
- September 14 – America for Sale
- September 21 – Robert Bork
- September 28 – Bill Cosby
- October 5 – Soviet Space Program (Energia rocket)
- October 12 – Hite Report
- October 19 – Greenhouse Effect
- October 26 – A day in the life of the Soviet Union during Perestroika (Kindergartners under a portrait of Lenin)
- November 2 – The Stock Market Crash
- November 9 – America's Leadership Crisis
- November 16 – Glenn Close & Michael Douglas (Fatal Attraction)
- November 23 – Reinvigorating the City
- November 30 – Alcoholism
- December 7 – Shirley MacLaine
- December 14 – Mikhail Gorbachev
- December 21 – Famine in Ethiopia
- December 28 – Gary Hart

== 1988 ==
- January 4 – Mikhail Gorbachev, Man of the Year
- January 11 – 1968
- January 18 – Andrew Lloyd Webber
- January 25 – Iowa Primary
- February 1 – Principal Joe Clark
- February 8 – Dan Rather
- February 15 – Debi Thomas
- February 22 – Americans Are Living Longer
- February 29 – The Presidential Pack (Michael Dukakis, Dick Gephardt, Bob Dole, George H. W. Bush, Pat Robertson, Jesse Jackson, Jack Kemp & Al Gore)
- March 7 – Manuel Noriega
- March 14 – Superman at 50
- March 21 – George H. W. Bush
- March 28 – Computers of the Future
- April 4 – Israel at 40
- April 11 – Jesse Jackson
- April 18 – War Over Smoking
- April 25 – Michael Eisner & Mickey Mouse
- May 2 – Michael Dukakis
- May 9 – Kids Who Sell Crack
- May 16 – Nancy Reagan & Astrology (from Donald Regan's memoirs)
- May 23 – The Immune System
- May 30 – Legalizing Drugs
- June 6 – Raisa Gorbacheva
- June 13 – Ronald Reagan & Mikhail Gorbachev
- June 20 – Gardening
- June 27 – Mike Tyson
- July 4 – Drought
- July 11 – Edward James Olmos
- July 18 – Exploring Mars
- July 25 – Lloyd Bentsen & Michael Dukakis
- August 1 – Ocean Pollution
- August 8 – Growing Up In America (Katie Davis)
- August 15 – Mosaic of Christ
- August 22 – George H. W. Bush
- August 29 – George H. W. Bush & Dan Quayle
- September 5 – Begging in America
- September 12 – Gridlock
- September 19 – Jackie Joyner-Kersee (1988 Summer Olympics)
- September 26 – Computer Viruses
- October 3 – John Sasso & James Baker
- October 10 – U.S. Returns to Space
- October 17 – Networks Under Fire
- October 24 – Politics of Personality
- October 31 – Clawsons of Ohio & Fernald Feed Materials Production Center
- November 7 – Enrique Camarena
- November 14 – Teacher Carol Bowen
- November 21 – George H. W. Bush
- November 28 – J. F. K.'s Assassination
- December 5 – Ross Johnson
- December 12 – Good News for the Heart
- December 19 – Ronald Reagan, George H. W. Bush & Mikhail Gorbachev
- December 26 – Yasser Arafat

== 1989 ==
- January 2 – Endangered Earth, Planet of the Year
- January 9 – Gene Hackman & Willem Dafoe
- January 16 – Donald Trump
- January 23 – Barbara Bush
- January 30 – George H. W. Bush
- February 6 – Guns & Violence
- February 13 – James Baker
- February 20 – Marine Spy Scandal
- February 27 – Ayatullah Khomeini
- March 6 – John Tower
- March 13 – Middle-Class Blacks
- March 20 – Mapping Human Genes
- March 27 – Poisoned Grapes
- April 3 – Student Athletes & Education
- April 10 – Changing U.S.S.R.: Special issue on Perestroika, Glasnost & Demokratizatsiya
- April 17 – Alaska: America's Last Frontier
- April 24 – America's Rat Race
- May 1 – Abortion & The Court
- May 8 – Cold Fusion? (Martin Fleischmann & Stanley Pons)
- May 15 – Eduard Shevardnadze
- May 22 – Panama's Election (Guillermo Ford attacked by a member of the Dignity Battalions)
- May 29 – Chinese Demonstrator
- June 5 – Protests in Beijing & Moscow
- June 12 – Massacre in Beijing
- June 19 – Revolt Against Communism
- June 26 – Kevin Costner
- July 3 – The Sun
- July 10 – Pete Rose
- July 17 – Gun Deaths (photo of Tawanah Jean Griggs)
- July 24 – Joseph Hazelwood
- July 31 – Doctors & Patients
- August 7 – Diane Sawyer
- August 14 – Joseph Cicippio, William R. Higgins, Terry Waite & Other Hostages
- August 21 – George H. W. Bush
- August 28 – 50th Anniversary of World War II
- September 4 – The Rolling Stones
- September 11 – Citizens Fight Drugs (Rantine McKesson)
- September 18 – Saving the Rain Forest
- September 25 – Atlantic City
- October 2 – A Day in the Life of China (Old woman of Wuxi)
- October 9 – Adoption
- October 16 – The Ivory Trail
- October 23 – George Washington
- October 25 – 150 Years of Photojournalism
- October 30 – San Francisco Earthquake
- November 6 – Eastern Europe Breaks Away
- November 13 – Arsenio Hall
- November 20 – The Berlin Wall
- November 27 – Skyrocketing Art Prices (Pablo Picasso's Au Lapin Agile)
- December 4 – A Future for Feminism?
- December 11 – George H. W. Bush & Mikhail Gorbachev
- December 18 – Money Laundering
- December 25 – Tom Cruise (Born on the Fourth of July)

Previous	Lists of covers of Time magazine	Next
1970s	1980s	1990s
