= List of covers of Time magazine (2000s) =

This is a list of people or topics appearing on the cover of Time magazine in the first decade of the 2000s. Time was first published in 1923. As Time became established as one of the United States' leading news magazines, an appearance on the cover of Time became an indicator of notability, fame or notoriety. Such features were accompanied by articles.

For other decades, see Lists of covers of Time magazine.

== 2000 ==
Date	Names or topics	Caption
January 1	New Year's Eve 2000	Welcome to a New Century
January 17	Elian Gonzalez	Where Does He Belong?
January 24	Steve Case & Jerry Levin	The Big Deal
January 31	George W. Bush, Al Gore, Bill Bradley & John McCain	The Mad Dash
February 7	Big Money & Politics	Who Gets Hurt
February 14	John McCain	The McCain Mutiny
February 21	Leonardo DiCaprio (The Beach)	Leo Up Close
February 28	George W. Bush	What Drives Bush
March 6	Amadou Diallo	Cops, Brutality & Race
March 13	Katie Couric	Katie's Crusade
March 20	The Rebirth of Design	Function is out. Form is in. From radios to cars to toothbrushes, America is bowled over by style.
March 27	Stephen King	Do-It-Yourself.com
April 3	Pope John Paul II (Great Jubilee)	The Pope in the Holy Land
April 10	Visions of Space & Science	In the Future Will We...
April 17	Elian & Juan Miguel Gonzalez	Elian and his Dad
April 24	Testosterone	It restores sex drive. It boosts muscle mass. And soon you can get it as a gel. But is also can be dangerous. Is the edge worth it?
April 26	Earth Day 2000: How To Save The Earth	
May 1	Elian & Juan Miguel Gonzalez	"Papa!"
May 8	The Untold Saga of the Vikings	They beat Columbus to the New World by 500 years. Fresh research show how they influenced us-and still do.
May 15	The Love Bug	How it works How to protect yourself from viruses Bill Gates defends the Microsoft monolith
May 22	Jobs of the Future	Tom Peters on which careers will flourish-and vanish
May 29	America Remembers the Soldiers	Last Letters from Home
June 5	What Ecstasy Does to Your Brain	The Science The Rave Scene Inside a Crime Ring
June 12	Improving Your Memory	How to Improve Your Memory The pills, the fads-and the science
June 19	Future of Technology	Smart Cars, uppity robots, and cybersex. Are you ready?
June 26	Voyeur TV	We like to watch
July 3	J. Craig Venter & Dr. Francis Collins	Cracking the Code!
July 10	Life on the Mississippi	An eye-opening journey along America's river of dreams
July 17	New Science of Alzheimer's disease	The drugs The genetics The latest theories What you can do now
July 24	The New Philanthropists	They're hands on. They want results. Who gives and how much.
July 31	Dr. Ingo Potrykus	This rice could save a million kids a year
August 7	The Bush Dynasty (Republican Convention)	The Making of a Candidate
August 14	Tiger Woods	Tiger's Tale
August 21	Joe Lieberman & Al Gore (Democratic Convention)	Chutzpah!
August 28	Sex & The City	Who Needs a Husband?
September 4	Kofi Annan	Kofi Annan
September 11	Marion Jones (Olympics)	Marion Jones wants five golds. Can she do it?
September 18	Dying in America	Dying on Our Own Terms
September 25	What Divorce Does to Kids	
October 2	Shawn Fanning	What's Next for Napster
October 9	Abortion pill	
October 16	Serbia: Free at Last	Free at Last
October 23	Terror in the Middle East	Terror in the Middle East
October 30	Early Puberty	Why Girls are Growing Up Faster
November 6	George W. Bush & Al Gore	The Choice
November 13	Foster Care Crisis	The Shame of Foster Care
November 20	George W. Bush & Al Gore	The Wildest Election in History
November 27	George W. Bush & Al Gore	Unprecedented Is this any way to run an election?
December 4	George W. Bush & Al Gore	537 Votes Bush's New Margin
December 11	George W. Bush & Al Gore	The Supreme Showdown
December 18	U.S. Voting System	Yes, we'll survive.
December 25	George W. Bush, Person of the Year	President-elect George W. Bush

== 2001 ==
Date	Names or topics
January 8	Economic Survival Tips
January 15	Future of Drugs
January 22	John Ashcroft
January 29	Power Failures
February 5	Living Healthy
February 12	AIDS in Africa
February 19	Human Cloning
February 26	Bill Clinton
March 5	Dale Earnhardt
March 12	SATs
March 19	School Violence
March 26	Recession
April 2	Phobias
April 9	Global warming
April 16	Jerusalem: Then & Now
April 23	The Science of Yoga
April 30	How to Educate Our Kids
May 7	Bob Kerrey
May 14	Alzheimer's disease
May 21	Timothy McVeigh
May 28	Drugs That Fight Cancer
June 4	George W. Bush
June 11	The U.S.-Mexico Border
June 18	Erik Weihenmayer
June 25	How the Universe Will End
July 2	Privacy Online
July 9	Julia Roberts
July 16	War Over the West
July 23	Human Evolution
July 30	Sharks
August 6	Modern-Day Children
August 13	The Kennedy Family
August 20	James Thomson
August 27	Home Schooling
September 3	Venus & Serena Williams
September 10	Colin Powell
September 14	Special Edition: Sept. 11
September 15	Music Goes Global: Björk, Brenda Fassie, Marc Anthony, Hikaru Utada, Max de Castro, Shakira
September 17	Preacher T. D. Jakes
September 24	George W. Bush
October 1	Osama bin Laden
October 8	How Real Is The Threat
October 15	Facing the Fury
October 22	The Fear Factor
October 29	War on terrorism
November 5	George W. Bush
November 12	Osama bin Laden
November 19	Thanksgiving 2001
November 26	Osama bin Laden
December 3	Women of Afghanistan
December 10	George Harrison
December 17	The Taliban
December 24	Closing In
December 31	Rudy Giuliani, Person of the Year

== 2002 ==
Date	Names or topics
January 14	Steve Jobs
January 21	The Science of Staying Healthy
January 28	Personal Finance
February 4	Enron
February 11	Sarah Hughes (Winter Olympics)
February 18	Breast Cancer
February 25	Jamie Sale & David Pelletier
March 4	Bono
March 11	Stopping the Next Attack
March 18	The war on terror
March 25	Middle East
April 1	The Catholic Church Dilemma
April 8	Yasser Arafat
April 15	Babies vs. Career
April 22	Medical Testing
April 29	Yoda
May 6	Autism
May 13	Saddam Hussein
May 20	Spider-Man
May 27	While America Slept
June 3	The Bombshell Memo
June 10	Anxiety
June 17	George W. Bush
June 24	Tom Cruise (Minority Report)
July 1	The Bible & & The Apocalypse
July 8	Lewis & Clark
July 15	Being a Vegetarian
July 22	Hormones
July 29	Retiring
August 5	Bruce Springsteen
August 12	Nine Months Before 9/11
August 19	Young & Bipolar
August 26	How to Save the Earth
September 2	Carbs & Fats
September 9	September 11 Memorial Issue
September 16	Saddam Hussein
September 23	Al-Qaeda Terrorist
September 30	Abraham
October 7	Preventing Headaches
October 14	Inside the New American Home
October 21	The Science of Catching a Killer
October 28	Al-Qaeda Terrorist
November 4	Legalizing Marijuana
November 11	Inside the Tomb
November 18	George W. Bush & Karl Rove
November 25	Osama bin Laden
December 2	Return of the Rings
December 9	Arthritis
December 16	American Indians & Casinos
December 18	Pictures of the Year
December 23	Trent Lott
December 30	The Whistleblowers, Persons of the Year

== 2003 ==
Date	Names or topics
January 13	Kim Jong-il
January 20	How Your Mind Can Heal Your body
January 27	Donald Rumsfeld
February 3	The CIA's Secret Army
February 5	Style & Design 2003
February 10	Columbia Disaster
February 17	DNA Turns 50
February 24	Living in Terror
March 3	George W. Bush
March 10	Saddam Hussein
March 17	Tommy Franks
March 24	Families at War, featuring Lieut. Colonel Laura Richardson
March 30	Time's 80th anniversary
March 31	Gulf War II
April 7	What Will It Take to Win?
April 14	Saddam's Last Stand
April 21	After the Fall
April 28	Women & Heart Disease
May 5	The Truth About SARS
May 12	Secrets of the New Matrix
May 19	Franklin D. Roosevelt
May 26	Hey, Where's My Raise?
June 2	What Makes You Special
June 9	The Doctor Is Out
June 16	Hillary Clinton
June 23	Why Harry Potter Rules
June 30	Should Christians Convert Muslims?
July 7	Benjamin Franklin
July 14	Peace Is Hell
July 21	Untruth and Consequences
July 28	Overcoming Dyslexia
August 4	The Science of Meditation
August 11	Howard Dean
August 18	Arnold Schwarzenegger (California governor election)
August 25	Blackout
August 28	Style & Design: Inside Fashion
September 1	Is the Army Stretched Too Thin
September 8	What's Next
September 15	The Saudis
September 22	Johnny Cash
September 29	Ronald Reagan
October 6	Mission Not Accomplished
October 13	The War Over the Leak
October 20	The Secrets of Eating Smarter
October 27	Inside the New SATs
November 3	Medicating Young Minds
November 10	Russell Crowe
November 17	Jessica Lynch
November 24	Where the New Jobs Are
December 1	George W. Bush
December 8	Diabetes: Are You at Risk?
December 15	The Hidden Enemy
December 22	We Got Him
December 29	The American Soldier, Person of the Year

== 2004 ==
Date	Names or topics
January 12	Howard Dean
January 19	Love, Sex & Health
January 26	Mission to Mars
February 2	Why Your Drugs Cost So Much
February 9	What Kind of President Would John Kerry Be?
February 16	Does Bush Have a Credibility Gap?
February 23	Inflammation: The Secret Killer
March 1	Are Too Many Jobs Going Abroad?
March 8	Afghanistan: The Other War
March 15	Iraq: Looking for a Way Out
March 22	The Case for Moms Staying Home
March 29	Al-Qaeda: The Next Generation
April 5	Feeling the Heat
April 12	Why Did Jesus Have to Die?
April 15	Style & Design: Retro Modernism
April 19	State of Siege
April 26	The Time 100
May 3	Low-Carb Nation
May 10	Secrets of the Teen Brain
May 17	Iraq: How Did it Come to This?
May 24	Moment of Truth
May 31	D-Day
June 7	Overcoming Obesity in America
June 14	Ronald Reagan
June 21	Faith, God & the Oval Office
June 28	Bill Clinton
July 5	Thomas Jefferson
July 12	Michael Moore (Fahrenheit 9/11)
July 19	John Edwards & John Kerry
July 26	It's Vegas Baby
August 2	John Kerry
August 9	Michael Phelps (Olympics)
August 16	Al-Qaeda in America
August 23	Saving the Big Cats
August 30	How to Live to be 100
September 6	George W. Bush
September 13	The Struggle Within Islam
September 14	Style & Design: Luxury Fever
September 20	America's Border
September 27	Who Owns the Truth?
October 4	The Tragedy of Sudan
October 11	Visions of Tomorrow
October 18	George W. Bush & John Kerry
October 25	The God Gene
November 1	The Morning After
November 8	The Joy of Sox
November 15	George W. Bush
November 22	Street Fight: The Battle for Fallujah
November 29	The Most Amazing Inventions of 2004
December 6	The Stealth Killer
December 13	Secrets of the Nativity
December 20	The New Science of Sleep
December 27	George W. Bush, Person of the Year

== 2005 ==
Date	Names or topics
January 10	Tsunami
January 17	The Science of Happiness
January 24	They Just Won't Grow Up
January 31	Iraq: How Soon Can We Get Out?
February 7	The Most Influential Evangelicals in America
February 14	Merchant of Menace
February 21	What Teachers Hate About Parents
February 28	The Right (and Wrong) Way to Treat Pain
March 7	Women and the Math Myth
March 14	How to End Poverty
March 21	Hail, Mary
March 28	Has TV Gone Too Far?
April 4	The End of Life: Who Decides?
April 11	Pope John Paul II
April 18	The 2005 Time 100
April 25	Ann Coulter
May 2	Pope Benedict XVI (Conclave)
May 9	The Last Star Wars
May 16	A Female Midlife Crisis?
May 23	Bill Gates
May 30	The Class of 9/11
June 6	How to Get Fitter & Faster
June 13	Home $weet Home
June 20	Inside the Wire at Gitmo
June 27	China's New Revolution
July 4	Abraham Lincoln
July 11	The Supreme Battle
July 18	Rush Hour Terror
July 25	Karl Rove
August 1	Eyewitnesses to Hiroshima
August 8	Being 13
August 15	The Evolution Wars
August 22	The 25 Most Influential Hispanics in America
August 29	Kanye West
September 5	How to Stop a Heart Attack Before it Happens
September 12	An American Tragedy
September 19	System Failure
September 26	Is It Too Late To Win the War?
October 3	Are We Making Hurricanes Worse?
October 10	The Battle Over Gay Teens
October 17	Andrew Weil
October 24	Steve Jobs
October 31	The Great Retirement Ripoff
November 7	How to Save a Life
November 14	The Secrets of Ambition
November 21	The Most Amazing Inventions of 2005
November 28	New Orleans Blues
December 5	The Year in Medicine from A to Z
December 12	Steven Spielberg (Munich)
December 19	The Best Photos of 2005
December 26	Bill Gates, Bono & Melinda Gates

== 2006 ==
Date	Names or topics
January 9	The Secret Agony of Martin Luther King Jr.
January 16	Jack Abramoff
January 23	Bode Miller
January 30	Bill Ford
February 6	Inside America's Secret Workforce
February 13	Is America Flunking Science?
February 20	Larry Page, Eric Schmidt & Sergey Brin
February 27	Dick Cheney & George W. Bush
March 6	Iraq Breaking Point
March 13	Daria Werbowy
March 13	The Untold Saga of Early Man in America
March 27	Are Kids Too Wired for Their Own Good?
April 3	Global Warming: Be Worried. Be Very Worried
April 10	Who Gets to Be an American?
April 17	Christine Harden
April 24	The Ways of Opus Dei
May 1	What Doctors Hate About Hospitals
May 8	The Time 100
May 15	Nick Furth
May 22	Michael Hayden
May 29	Dixie Chicks
June 5	Congo: The Hidden Toll of the World's Deadliest War
June 12	Haditha
June 19	Abu Musab al-Zarqawi
June 26	India Inc.
July 3	Theodore Roosevelt
July 10	How Your Siblings Make You Who You Are
July 17	The End of Cowboy Diplomacy
July 24	Why They Fight and Why It's Different This Time
July 31	The Way Out...Of This Mess. The Six Keys To Peace in the Middle East.
August 7	The Truth About Stem Cells: The Hope, The Hype and What it Means For You
August 14	Life in Hell: A Baghdad Diary
August 21	Who Needs Harvard?
August 28	Hillary Clinton
September 4	How The Stars Were Born
September 10	Doutzen Kroes
September 11	What We Lost
September 18	Does God Want You To Be Rich?
September 25	What War With Iran Would Look Like (And How To Avoid It)
October 2	How I Lost My Hand But Found Myself
October 9	How We Became Human
October 16	What A Mess...
October 23	Why Barack Obama Could Be The Next President
October 30	The United States of America
November 6	George W. Bush
November 13	God vs. Science
November 20	Why the center is the New Place to Be
November 21	Style & Design Winter 2006
November 28	Pope Benedict XVI
December 4	Why We Worry About the Wrong Things
December 11	George W. Bush
December 18	How To Build a Student For the 21st Century
December 25	You, Person of the Year

== 2007 ==
Date	Names or topics
January 15	The Surge
January 22	China: New Dawn of a Dynasty
January 29	Mind & Body Special Issue: The Brain
February 5	Only 648 Days until the Election
February 12	Back To Reality
February 19	Haji Bashar Noorzai
February 26	The Abortion Campaign You Never Hear About
March 4	Style & Design Spring 2007
March 5	Sunni vs. Shi'ites: Why They Hate Each Other
March 12	Forget Organic. Eat Local
March 19	Dick Cheney
March 26	Ronald Reagan
April 2	Why We Should Teach The Bible in Public School
April 9	The Global Warming Survival Guide
April 16	Why Our Army Is at the Breaking Point
April 22	Style & Design Summer 2007
April 23	Don Imus
April 30	Trying To Make Sense of a Massacre
May 7	America at 400
May 14	The Time 100: The Most Influential People in The World
May 21	Mitt Romney
May 28	Al Gore
June 4	Report Card on No Child Left Behind
June 11	The Science of Appetite
June 18	Why Amnesty Makes Sense
June 25	Michael Bloomberg & Arnold Schwarzenegger
July 2	John F. Kennedy
July 9	Rupert Murdoch
July 16	How We Get Addicted
July 23	How The Democrats Got Religion
July 30	Iraq: What Will Happen When We Leave
August 6	The Myth About Boys
August 13	Why New Orleans Still Isn't Safe
August 19	Style & Design Visionaries
August 20	The Political Confessions of Billy Graham
August 27	The Genius Problem
September 3	Mother Teresa
September 10	The Case for National Service
September 16	Hilary Rhoda
September 17	David Petraeus
September 24	The Running Mates
October 1	Who Owns the Arctic?
October 8	V-22 Osprey
October 15	Why Breast Cancer Is Spreading Around The World
October 22	John Roberts
October 29	The Secrets Of Birth Order
November 5	Why California Is Burning
November 12	Best Inventions of 2007
November 19	Hillary Clinton
November 25	Style & Design: The Luxury Index
November 26	America by the Numbers
December 3	What Makes Us Good/Evil
December 10	Barack Obama
December 17	Now They Tell Us?
December 24	This Space Available
December 31	Vladimir Putin, Person of the Year

== 2008 ==
Date	Names or topics	Caption
January 14	Benazir Bhutto	No One Could Save Benazir Bhutto. Why We Need to Save Pakistan
January 21	Voters in voting booths	New Hampshire Special: It's the Voters, Stupid
January 28	Comic book style illustration of couple kissing	Annual Minds & Body Special Issue: The Science of Romance
February 4	John McCain	The Phoenix: Can John McCain Keep Rising?
February 11	Group of young voters	Why Young Voters Care Again
February 18	Hillary Clinton & Barack Obama	Super Tuesday Special: The Battle For the Soul of the Democrats
February 25	Julie Court, 6th grade teacher at Queens Village, NY, Middle School	How To Make Better Teachers
March 3	George Clooney	The Last Movie Star: How George Clooney Plays the Game
March 10	Barack Obama	How Much Does Experience Matter?
March 17	Hillary Clinton	The Fighter: How she came back – and why it could be too late
March 24	The number 10 with the Earth in place of a zero	10 Ideas That Are Changing the World
March 31	Dalai Lama VII	The Dalai Lama's Journey
April 7	Ear of corn with dollar bills instead of husks	The Clean Energy Myth
April 14	Pope Benedict XVI and American landmarks	Why the Pope Loves America
April 21	Ann Dunham & Barack Obama	Raising Obama
April 28	Flag raising at Iwo Jima with tree in place of flag	Special Environmental Issue: How to Win The War On Global Warming
May 5	Barack Obama & Hillary Clinton split in half	There Can Only Be One
May 12	Collage of Time covers	The Time 100
May 19	Barack Obama	And the Winner* Is... (*Yes, we're pretty sure this time)
May 26	Skinny piggy bank	Surviving the Lean Economy
June 2	Baby making face at vaccine	The Truth About Vaccines
June 9	Fire alarm	How to Survive a Disaster
June 16	Prozac pill in Army camouflage	The Military's Secret Weapon
June 23	Obese child on skateboard	Special Health Issue: Our Super-Sized Kids
June 30	United States-Mexico border wall	The Great Wall of America
July 7	American flag pin	The Real Meaning of Patriotism
July 14	Mark Twain	Annual Making of America Issue: The Dangerous Mind of Mark Twain
July 21	Nelson Mandela	Mandela at 90: The Secrets of Leadership
July 28	U.S. soldier in Afghanistan	Afghanistan: The Right War
August 4	LeBron James	Beijing '08 Summer Olympic Preview
August 11	Barack Obama & John McCain	Special Report: Job #1 – The Economy
August 18	Rick Warren	The Purpose Driven Pastor
August 25	Russian soldier on road to Tbilisi	How to Stop a New Cold War
September 1	Barack Obama	Special Issue: The Democrats
September 8	John McCain	Special Issue: The Republicans
September 15	Sarah Palin	The Education of Sarah Palin
September 22	Barack Obama & John McCain as construction workers	Second Annual National Service Issue: 21 Ways to Fix Up America
September 29	Legs sticking out of hole	How Wall Street Sold Out America
October 5	Tom Ford	
October 6	Ballot with options of John McCain, Barack Obama, and None of the Above	Who Can Rescue The Economy?
October 13	Soup line during Great Depression	The New Hard Times
October 20	Barack Obama split into white half and colored half	Campaign Special: Why the Economy is Trumping Race
October 27	Barack Obama, Abraham Lincoln, John McCain & Franklin D. Roosevelt	Does Temperament Matter?
November 2	Sylvia Tamburo	
November 3	Electronic voting machine	7 Things That Could Go Wrong on Election Day
November 10	Barack Obama & John McCain	Special Issue: The Choice
November 17	Barack Obama, Chicago, November 4, 2008	Commemorative Issue: "Change has come to America"
November 24	Barack Obama as Franklin D. Roosevelt at his 1933 inauguration	The New New Deal
November 30	The Luxury Index	
December 1	Patient having throat examined with tongue depressor	Annual Checkup: The Sorry State of American Health
December 8	Michelle Rhee	How to Fix America's Schools
December 15	Wrenches tightening bolts in a rusty GM logo	The Case for Saving Detroit
December 22	Collection of lists	The List Issue
December 29	Barack Obama in style of Hope poster	2008 Person of the Year

== 2009 ==
Date	Names or topics	Caption
January 12	Sweater with energy-efficient lightbulb in collar	Why We Need To See the Light About Energy Efficiency
January 19	Star of David behind barbed wire and wall	Why Israel Can't Win
January 26	Barack Obama	Great Expectations
February 2	Barack Obama & Michelle Obama	President Barack Obama: January 20, 2009
February 9	Stem cells	How the Coming Revolution in Stem Cells Could Save Your Life
February 16	Fish wrapped in issue of The New York Times	How to Save Your Newspaper
February 23	Woman meditating	Mind and Body Special Issue: How Faith Can Heal
March 2	Kate Winslet	Best Actress: Why It's Kate Winslet
March 9	Hands grasping frayed rope	Holding On for Dear Life/The Economy & You: A Special Report
March 16	Bottle of pills	So You Think You're Insured?
March 22	Arlenis Sosa	
March 23	The Earth	10 Ideas Changing the World Right Now
March 30	Bomb with AIG logo	The Bailout Bomb
April 6	Reset button	The End of Excess
April 13	Sumatran tiger	Special Environment Issue: Vanishing Act
April 20	A U.S. soldier	How Not To Lose in Afghanistan
April 27	Coin jar	The New Frugality
May 3	Style & Design: The Green Design 100	
May 4	Barack Obama	100 Days
May 11	Collage of Time covers	Time 100
May 18	GOP elephant	Endangered Species
May 25	Man split into casual upper half and formal lower half	The Future of Work
June 1	Michelle Obama	The Meaning of Michelle
June 8	Sonia Sotomayor	Latina Justice
June 15	Tweet advertising cover story	
June 22	Empty hospital bed	The Health Issue: It's All About Prevention
June 29	Mousavi supporters	Iran vs. Iran
July 6	Franklin D. Roosevelt	Annual Making of America Issue: What Barack Obama Can Learn From FDR
July 7	Michael Jackson	Special Commemorative Issue
July 13	Wedding cake with couple figurines pushed inside	Unfaithfully Yours
July 20	Sarah Palin	The Renegade
July 27	Buzz Aldrin on the Moon, 1969	Moonstruck: 40th Anniversary of Apollo 11
August 3	Dick Cheney & George W. Bush	Special Report: The Final Days of Bush and Cheney
August 10	Barack Obama in doctor's garb	Health Care Special Report: Paging Dr. Obama
August 17	Woman exercising on treadmill visualizing cupcake	The Myth about Exercise
August 24	Las Vegas sign with "Las" changed to "Less"	Less Vegas
August 31	Package of hamburger meat	The Real Cost of Cheap Food
September 7	Ted Kennedy	Ted Kennedy: 1932–2009
September 13	Style & Design: Fashion's Bright Side	
September 14	Jay Leno	Jay Leno Is the Future of Television. Seriously!
September 21	Jobless Americans	Out of Work in America
September 28	Glenn Beck	Mad Man
October 5	Derelict scene in Detroit	The Tragedy Of Detroit
October 12	Chet Millard	The War Up Close
October 19	401(k) text amid rising waters	Why It's Time to Retire the 401(k)
October 26	Elena Evangelo	The State of the American Woman
November 2	Computer chip in shape of California	Why California Is Still America's Future
November 9	Man with cartoon eyebrows, mustache, and mouth	Why Main Street Hates Wall Street
November 16	Hillary Clinton	The State of Hillary
November 23	Nidal Malik Hasan	Terrorist?
November 30	Child with strings attached	The Case Against Over-Parenting
December 7	Crying baby at New Year's party	The Decade from Hell
December 14	President Obama amid West Point cadets	It's His War Now
December 21	Collage of pictures	Special Issue: The Year in Pictures
December 28	Ben Bernanke	Person of the Year 2009

Previous	Lists of covers of Time magazine	Next
1990s	2000s	2010s
