= 1995 United States federal budget =

1995 Budget of the United States federal government
- Submitted by: Bill Clinton
- Submitted to: 103rd Congress
- Country: United States
- Total revenue: $1.35 trillion (actual); 17.8% of GDP (actual)
- Total expenditures: $1.52 trillion (actual); 20% of GDP (actual)
- Deficit: $164 billion (actual); 2.2% of GDP (actual)
- Debt: $4.925 trillion (at fiscal end); 64.9% of GDP
- GDP: $7.583 trillion

The 1995 United States federal budget is the United States federal budget to fund government operations for the fiscal year 1995, which was October 1994 – September 1995. This budget was the last to be submitted before the Republican Revolution in the 1994 midterm elections.

== Receipts ==
1995 Actual Receipts by Source
1. Individual income tax (43.7%)
2. Social Security/other payroll tax (35.8%)
3. Corporate income tax (11.6%)
4. Excise tax (4.20%)

(in billions of dollars)

Source	Actual
Individual income tax	590
Corporate income tax	157
Social Security and other payroll tax	484
Excise tax	57
Other miscellaneous receipts	63
Total	1,351

== Outlays ==
The total outlays for FY1995 was 1.52 trillion dollars as authorized by congress.

=== Deficit/Surplus ===
The budget had an estimated deficit for enacted legislation of $164 billion.
2.2% of GDP
