= Hidden history =

Hidden history may refer to:

== Books ==
- Hidden Histories of Gender and the State in Latin America, a collection of non-fiction essays about the history of women in post-colonial through 20th century Latin American society
- The Hidden History of The JFK Assassination, 2013 non-fiction book by Lamar Waldron
- The Hidden History of Guns and the Second Amendment, 2019 non-fiction book by Thom Hartmann
- All the Devils Are Here: The Hidden History of the Financial Crisis, a 2010 nonfiction book by authors Bethany McLean and Joe Nocera about the 2008 financial crisis
- Brothers: The Hidden History of the Kennedy Years, a non-fiction book by David Talbot
- Dark Money: The Hidden History of the Billionaires Behind the Rise of the Radical Right, a 2016 non-fiction book written by American investigative journalist Jane Mayer
- Love Songs: The Hidden History, a 2015 book by Ted Gioia
- The Borgias: The Hidden History, a 2013 non-fiction book by G. J. Meyer about the history of the Borgia family in Renaissance Italy
- The Secret Service: The Hidden History of an Enigmatic Agency, a 2002 book by Philip H. Melanson and Peter Stevens
- Wake: The Hidden History of Women-Led Slave Revolts, a 2022 graphic novel written by Rebecca Hall and illustrated by Hugo Martínez
- Watergate: The Hidden History: Nixon, The Mafia, and The CIA, book by Lamar Waldron

== Other ==
- Hidden History of the Human Race, the second studio album by American death metal band Blood Incantation
- Tipperary Museum of Hidden History, a local history museum in Clonmel, County Tipperary, Ireland.

== See also ==
- Secret History (disambiguation)
- People's history (disambiguation)
