= People's history (disambiguation) =

A people's history is a type of historical narrative which attempts to account for historical events from the perspective of common people rather than leaders. There is an emphasis on disenfranchised, the oppressed, the poor, the nonconformists, and otherwise marginal groups.

People's history may also refer to:

== Books ==
- A People's History of the United States, 1980 book by Howard Zinn
- A People's History of American Empire, a 2008 graphic history by Howard Zinn, Mike Konopacki, and Paul Buhle
- A People's History of Computing in the United States, a non-fiction book by Joy Lisi Rankin
- A People's History of Scotland, a 2014 book by Chris Bambery
- The Assassination of Julius Caesar: A People's History of Ancient Rome, a 2003 non-fiction book by Michael Parenti

== Entertainment ==
- A People's History of The Dismemberment Plan, a 2003 album by Washington D.C. indie band The Dismemberment Plan
- Canada: A People's History, documentary series on the history of Canada

== Places ==
- People's History Museum, a museum of the English working class

== See also ==
- The People's Story Museum
- Hidden history
- Secret history
