= Zachery Kouwe =

American public relations strategist and financial journalist

Zachery "Zach" Kouwe
- Born: March 17, 1978 (age 48); Geneva, New York, U.S.
- Occupations: Financial public relations strategist Journalist
- Website: www.zacherykouwe.com

Zachery "Zach" Kouwe (born March 17, 1978) is a communications strategist and former financial journalist. He is known for serving as a media and strategic communications advisor to corporations and financial firms including activist shareholders and institutional investors and has worked as an advisor for the corporate whistleblower attorney Jordan A. Thomas.

Prior to public relations, he wrote extensively about Wall Street, private equity, hedge funds and white-collar crime, most recently for The New York Times. He served as a researcher for Joe Nocera and Bethany McLean on their book All the Devils Are Here: The Hidden History of the Financial Crisis.

== Early life and education ==
Kouwe was raised in Tampa, Florida and graduated in 2000 from Hamilton College. He earned an M.A. in Journalism and Mass Communication from the University of Colorado at Boulder.

== Career ==
=== Journalism ===
Kouwe began his journalism career in 2000 as a reporter for the trade publication Wall Street Letter, published by Institutional Investor. In 2002, Kouwe edited Institutional Investor's Spring ETF Report, a publication on the burgeoning market for exchange-traded funds. He joined the Times in October 2008, aged 30, becoming one of the newspaper's last hires before it announced a 5% cut in wages and a 10% reduction in its newsroom staff. At the Times, Kouwe wrote for the DealBook blog, which covers mergers and acquisitions, hedge funds and private equity. He also wrote articles for the business section.

Before joining the Times, Kouwe was a business reporter at the New York Post for three years. Prior to joining The Post, he worked for the Dow Jones Newswires covering the private equity industry. He also worked as an intern for the Wall Street Journal and The Denver Post while earning a master's degree at the University of Colorado at Boulder's School of Journalism & Mass Communication.

=== News articles ===
Kouwe wrote, co-wrote or contributed to more than 1,600 articles and blog posts for the Times and authored 969 articles for The Post. He gained the attention of the financial journalism community by being the first to report that then New York Stock Exchange CEO John Thain had accepted a job to become the new head of Merrill Lynch during the 2008 financial crisis.

At the Times, a writing team that included Kouwe was a finalist for a Gerald Loeb Award for their reporting on the Bernard L. Madoff Ponzi scheme in 2009. He was also the paper's lead reporter covering the massive insider trading case centered on the Galleon Group hedge fund and its founder, Raj Rajaratnam.

In 2008, he was co-listed, with Peter Lauria, at #62 on the Silicon Alley 100, compiled by the web site SiliconAlleyInsider.com, for their reporting on Microsoft's failed takeover of Yahoo! in 2008. Kouwe also wrote a widely read front page article in the Times about the progress of the federal government's Troubled Asset Relief Program and another about a little-known insurance company, named the Customer Asset Protection Corp. (CAPCO), owned by several Wall Street firms.

=== Controversy ===
In February 2010 Kouwe was suspended from The New York Times after being accused of plagiarizing portions of an article. He resigned from his position shortly thereafter after admitting he made inadvertent mistakes in writing a blog post. The wrongdoing was originally brought to the attention of The Times on February 12 by Robert Thomson, managing editor of rival The Wall Street Journal, stating that portions of an article written by Kouwe and published on February 5 "were identical or nearly identical to a Journal article published online hours before...". Before Kouwe's resignation was announced, The Guardian had obtained and posted online a copy of Thomson's letter to The Times. The Times's Editor's Note on Kouwe's resignation specified that the original evidence referenced an article about "an asset freeze for members of Bernard L. Madoff’s family." The note further described the wrongdoing as "appropriat[ing] wording and passages published by other news organizations ... without attribution or acknowledgment." The term "plagiarism" was not used in the correction. The Times never officially corrected any other articles that Kouwe wrote.

Responding to the accusations in The New York Observer, Kouwe was quoted describing the action as inadvertent. "I was as surprised as anyone that this was occurring," he said of the revelations. He explained that his high volume of work ("7,000 words every week") and particular researching and writing style conducted "[i]n the essence of speed" were what led to the occurrences.

Times' standards editor Philip Corbett stated that most of what Kouwe lifted was "pretty banal stuff", like background material. Bill Reader, an assistant professor of at the E.W. Scripps School of Journalism, who teaches a class on media ethics, was cited in an article saying Kouwe's resignation was extreme and his explanation was believable.

=== Public relations ===
Kouwe became a financial public relations executive in 2011. He has become known for representing prominent activist investors as well as asset management firms. He was named as the "Top 15 finance PR leaders to follow on Twitter in 2022" by Muck Rack.
