= Bought & Sold =

Bought & Sold could mean:

- Bought & Sold (television program)
- Bought & Sold (book), 2016 book by Megan Stephens
- Bought & Sold: Scotland, Jamaica and Slavery, 2022 book by Kate Phillips
