= J. Clifford Baxter =

Enron Corporation executive (1958–2002)

Cliff Baxter
- Born: September 27, 1958; Amityville, New York, U.S.
- Died: January 25, 2002 (aged 43); Sugar Land, Texas, U.S.
- Cause of death: Suicide
- Education: New York University (BA); Columbia University (MBA)
- Occupation: Employee at Enron

John Clifford "Cliff" Baxter (September 27, 1958 – January 25, 2002) was an Enron Corporation executive who resigned in May 2001 before committing suicide the following year. Prior to his death he had agreed to testify before Congress in the Enron scandal.

== Early life ==
Baxter was born in Amityville, New York, and graduated from New York University. After graduating, he served in the U.S. Air Force from 1980 to 1985 and rose to the rank of captain. After he was discharged from the military, he enrolled at Columbia University where he received an MBA degree two years later. He worked in investment banking briefly before he joined Enron in 1991 where he rose to the executive position of chief strategy officer before his resignation.

== Scandal at Enron ==
On August 15, 2001, Sherron Watkins, Vice President of Corporate Development at Enron, wrote an anonymous letter to Kenneth Lay sharing her concerns about the company's accounting practices, and cited Baxter's prior complaints to Jeffrey Skilling, Andrew Fastow, and other Enron executives regarding what he considered Enron's unethical and possible illegal transactions. This was a day after the abrupt resignation of Skilling as CEO of Enron, who was later characterized by writers Bethany McLean and Peter Elkind in The Smartest Guys in the Room as being Baxter's closest friend at Enron.

Baxter would later be sued personally for $30 million after the bankruptcy of Enron due to his sale of $30 million worth of Enron stock in the months prior to Enron's bankruptcy in December 2001.

Fortune magazine writer Bethany McLean described Baxter in Enron: The Smartest Guys in the Room as being a good deal-maker but also being a manic depressive.

Skilling stated before Congress in February 2002 that Baxter had visited Skilling shortly after Enron had declared bankruptcy and was "heartbroken" by what had happened at Enron. In his testimony, Skilling quoted Baxter as saying: "They're calling us child molesters. That will never wash off."

== Suicide ==
On January 25, 2002, after agreeing to testify before Congressional committees in February 2002 after being subpoenaed regarding his knowledge and evidence of the scandal at Enron, Baxter was found dead in his black Mercedes-Benz S500 in Sugar Land, Texas, with a self-inflicted gunshot wound. The ammunition used was a Glaser Safety Slug, which at the time was misreported as snake shot. A revolver was found in his car and a suicide note was found in his wife's car at their home. An autopsy was performed by the Harris County Medical Examiner's Office and the death was ruled a suicide. Baxter's suicide was partly dramatized during the opening credits of Enron: The Smartest Guys in the Room.

His suicide note was hand printed, though not signed, for his wife, Carol. The letter expressed Baxter's despair over the direction his life had taken.

The full text of the note read:

Carol,
I am so sorry for this. I feel I just can't go on. I have always tried to do the right thing but where there was once great pride now it's gone. I love you and the children so much. I just can't be any good to you or myself. The pain is overwhelming.
Please try to forgive me.
Cliff
