= International Socialist Group (Scotland) =

- Leader: Collective leadership, Steering Group
- Founded: International Socialist Group (2011)
- Dissolved: 2015
- Split from: Socialist Workers Party (UK)
- Headquarters: Union Street, Glasgow, G1 3TA, Scotland, United Kingdom
- Newspaper: Communiqué
- Ideology: Revolutionary socialism
- Political position: Far-left

The International Socialist Group was a revolutionary socialist organisation based in Scotland which was formed in April 2011 by former members of the Socialist Workers Party. The group produced a free monthly broadsheet and online blog, Communiqué. The ISG participated in a number of campaigns, such as the Coalition of Resistance, Stop the War Coalition and the Radical Independence Campaign. In 2015 the ISG formally dissolved with its members participating in the Scottish Left Project, the organisational process which led to the RISE electoral alliance to contest the 2016 Scottish Parliamentary elections alongside the Scottish Socialist Party, individuals from the Radical Independence Campaign and other activists and trade unionists.

Notable figures within the ISG included Jonathon Shafi, co-founder of the Radical Independence Campaign, and Cat Boyd.

== History ==
In April 2011, 39 members of the Socialist Workers Party in Scotland, including Central Committee member Chris Bambery, the majority of the elected Scottish leadership, and the circulation officer for Socialist Worker, resigned from the SWP, stating that the party had no credible strategy to fight the government's cuts agenda. Members of the International Socialist Group argued that a realignment of the Scottish left with other progressive forces was possible. The ISG set itself the challenge of demonstrating successful cooperation with such forces which they believed was not possible or credible within the SWP which they left.

The resignations were followed by the formation of a new Marxist organisation called the International Socialist Group. It was predominantly based in Glasgow at first, but later expanded into Edinburgh, Dundee, and Aberdeen. In 2012, the ISG opened its National Office in Glasgow City Centre.

The ISG was a key organisation in the creation of the Radical Independence Campaign, which was established at its founding conference in 2012. In the run up to the Scottish independence referendum in 2014 the ISG through its involvement in RIC advocated a progressive and left-wing perspective on supporting Scottish independence. The ISG championed close cooperation and unity with other organisations and individuals perceived as being on the left of Scottish and international politics in its approach to RIC and the independence referendum.

Despite the referendum returning a 'No' vote, the ISG argued that the unity of purpose and action which was practiced during the referendum campaign demonstrated that the Scottish left could effectively work together in a new electoral organisation for the upcoming Scottish parliamentary elections. To this end, the ISG helped set up the Scottish Left Project to bring together like-minded groups and individuals to discuss a new electoral approach which culminated in the creation of RISE - Scotland's Left Alliance in 2015. Later that year the ISG formally dissolved to allow its members to fully participate in the new left-wing alliance - meeting the objective of building and participating in a new Scottish left organisation that the ISG set itself four years previously at its founding.

== Theory ==
The ISG focussed on left-wing unity and renewal in its written output. Articles have discussed the progressive potential of Scottish independence and its implications for the rest of the UK. They have also criticised 'Left British Nationalism'. Other issues discussed include the need for a realistic appraisal of the trade union movement and its relationship to the rising level of social movements, the rightward shift of Scottish Labour, and the need for new formats for left unity.

== Practice ==
The ISG took part in the Coalition of Resistance, which campaigned against austerity and organised numerous demonstrations and actions, including a women's march against cuts, the "We Are All Hana Shalabi" campaign which has organised demonstrations and occupations over Palestinian hunger strikes and Israeli assaults on the Gaza Strip, and the Radical Independence Campaign, which campaigned for Scottish independence on a progressive platform.

== Publications ==
Along with various books and pamphlets, the ISG published a free monthly colour broadsheet, Communiqué, with a Scottish editorial focus. The ISG's position on Scottish independence, outlined in Britain Must Break: The Internationalist Case for Independence by James Foley, received positive reviews from the Scottish left.

- Women on the Left (2013)
- Britain Must Break: The Internationalist Case for Independence (2012)
