= The Stress of Her Regard =

1989 novel by Tim Powers

- Author: Tim Powers
- Cover artist: James Gurney
- Language: English
- Genre: Historical fantasy, Horror fiction
- Publisher: Ace Books(Hardcover edition)
- Publication date: September 1989
- Publication place: United States
- Media type: Print (hardback & paperback)
- Pages: 392 pp (Hardcover edition)
- ISBN: 0-441-79055-0 (Hardcover edition)
- OCLC: 19516702
- Dewey Decimal: 813/.54 20
- LC Class: PS3566.O95 S87 1989
- Followed by: Hide Me Among the Graves (2012)

The Stress of Her Regard is a 1989 horror/fantasy novel by Tim Powers. It was nominated for the 1990 World Fantasy and Locus Awards in 1990, and won a Mythopoeic Award. As with a number of Powers's other novels, it proposes a secret history in which real events have supernatural causes: in this case, the lives of famous English Romantic writers—as well as political events in central Europe during the early 19th century—are largely determined by a race of protean vampire-like creatures known as nephilim.

Drawing from European and Middle Eastern mythology, Powers depicts these beings as having qualities of vampires, succubi, incubi, Lamia, fairies, and jinn. Not only predators but sometimes benefactors of humans, they are the basis for both the Muses and the Graeae.

== Plot ==
The story begins shortly before the wedding of Michael Crawford, a doctor. The night before he marries Julia, he inadvertently places his wedding ring in the hand of a statue in a garden. When he goes to retrieve it, he discovers the statue has mysteriously vanished.

Despite this mysterious event, the wedding proceeds. Julia's disturbed twin sister Josephine serves as the maid of honor. The next morning, Crawford awakes to discover Julia's horribly mutilated corpse next to him in the bed. Knowing he will be suspected of murdering his bride, Crawford flees to London and passes himself off as a medical student. He meets John Keats, who is also studying medicine. One day while visiting the wards they encounter the grief-stricken Josephine, who attempts to shoot Crawford to avenge her sister. A mysterious apparition saves him.

Keats does his best to help Crawford understand what has happened. By placing the wedding ring on the statue Crawford unwittingly attracted the attention of one of the nephilim, who now considers herself Crawford's true wife. The nephilim killed Julia so she could have Crawford for herself. Keats, who has some experience with the nephilim, recommends that Crawford visit the Alps. There is a place high in the mountains where he may be able to free himself from "the stress of her regard".

While traveling on the Continent, Crawford is called upon to assist another Englishman who is suffering from a seizure. The man is Percy Shelley, and is accompanied by Lord Byron, John Polidori, and Claire Clairmont. Byron and Shelley are also connected to the nephilim, which they see as both a blessing and a curse. The nephilim can prolong the lives of humans and serve as muses who help to inspire great works of creativity, but they are extremely jealous and will destroy anyone they see as a rival. Crawford and the two poets make their way up the Jungfrau, where it is said one might be able to break the bond with a nephilim. After answering a version of the Riddle of the Sphinx, Crawford manages to free himself from his "wife". In doing so he also learns more about the nature of the nephilim.

Yet the danger is not over for Crawford, the poets, and their loved ones. The nephilim are still active, and developments in Venice may threaten all humanity. Crawford, Josephine, Shelley, and Byron, all haunted by personal tragedy, must find a way to save themselves and the rest of the world from the nephilim.

== Reception ==
Pascal J. Thomas of the Quantum wrote Powers is "playing in a new register, giving up the Alexander Dumas-type adventure novel for a more mature, more complex kind of work" and that he "has lost nothing of his imagination and storytelling abilities", considering this to be Powers's best. Howard Mittelmark of The Washington Post wrote that while Powers's writing is "often vivid and arresting", it "ultimately it is all too much", and that he "throws out great twisting coils of ideas, layer upon layer, until his tale buckles beneath the weight of his invention." Sue Martin of the Los Angeles Times wrote while Powers "never fails to titillate and elucidate with the dark and the bizarre, and all with such original, eccentric color and style", towards the end of the novel, his "richness becomes a little too heavy and it seems to take far too long to get to the conclusion."
