= Sean M. Berkowitz =

American lawyer

- Born: 1967 (age 58–59)
- Education: Tulane University (B.A.); Harvard Law School (J.D.)
- Occupations: Attorney, Prosecutor
- Employer: Latham & Watkins LLP
- Known for: Lead prosecutor in Enron Task Force; Successful defense in Michael Sussman trial
- Spouse: Bethany McLean (m. 2008)

Sean M. Berkowitz (born 1967) is a former director of the Department of Justice's Enron Task Force. He prosecuted former employees of Enron who were accused of white collar crimes, principally accounting fraud. Most significantly, he was the lead prosecutor in the joint trial of Kenneth Lay and Jeffrey Skilling. In 2006, shortly after securing guilty verdicts against both, Berkowitz left the Department of Justice to become a partner at Latham & Watkins LLP in Chicago.

Berkowitz was assigned to the Task Force in December 2003 from the U.S. Attorney's Office for the Northern District of Illinois, where he led many high-profile prosecutions of white collar crime and corporate fraud. Prior to his five years at the United States Department of Justice, Berkowitz worked for the law firm Katten Muchin Zavis, now Katten Muchin Rosenman LLP, in Chicago, Illinois.

== Lay and Skilling trial ==
Berkowitz cross-examined Jeffrey K. Skilling (Enron President and COO), sending the former CEO into a temper tantrum on the stand. He was also the ending voice for the prosecution as he concluded the government’s closing arguments to the jury by urging them to send a message to Lay and Skilling that "you can’t buy justice, you have to earn it."

In his closing arguments, Berkowitz used a large black and white cardboard display with the word "truth" emblazoned on one side and "lies" on other side. "You get to decide whether they told truth or lies, black and white," he told the jury. "Don't let the defendants, with their high-paid experts and their lawyers, buy their way out of this," he said. "I'm asking you to send them a message that it's not all right. You can't buy justice; you have to earn it."

On May 25, 2006, after the jury found both Skilling and Lay guilty, Berkowitz scolded the Enron executives, saying that "you can't lie to shareholders, you can't put yourselves in front of your employees' interests. No matter how rich and powerful you are, you have to play by the rules." Berkowitz noted the FBI spent five years investigating the Enron case and that his team spent many long nights working on the trial, warning other executives who think about committing fraud that "no matter how complicated or sophisticated a case may be, people like that stand ready to investigate."

Berkowitz also successfully defended Michael Sussman in the only prosecution brought by John Durham to have gone to trial. Sussman was accused of lying to the FBI that he represented the Hillary Clinton for President Campaign. The jury acquitted him in its second day of deliberation. Sussman had reported about potential connections between the Trump Organization and Russia.

== Education ==
Berkowitz received his B.A. degree summa cum laude from Tulane University (with a Dean's Honor Scholarship) in 1989 and received his J.D. degree cum laude from Harvard Law School in 1992.

== Personal ==
Berkowitz married Bethany McLean, a Vanity Fair magazine editor and one of the authors of the book Enron: The Smartest Guys in the Room, in May 2008.
