= Chris Bambery =

Scottish political activist, socialist, author, journalist, TV presenter and producer

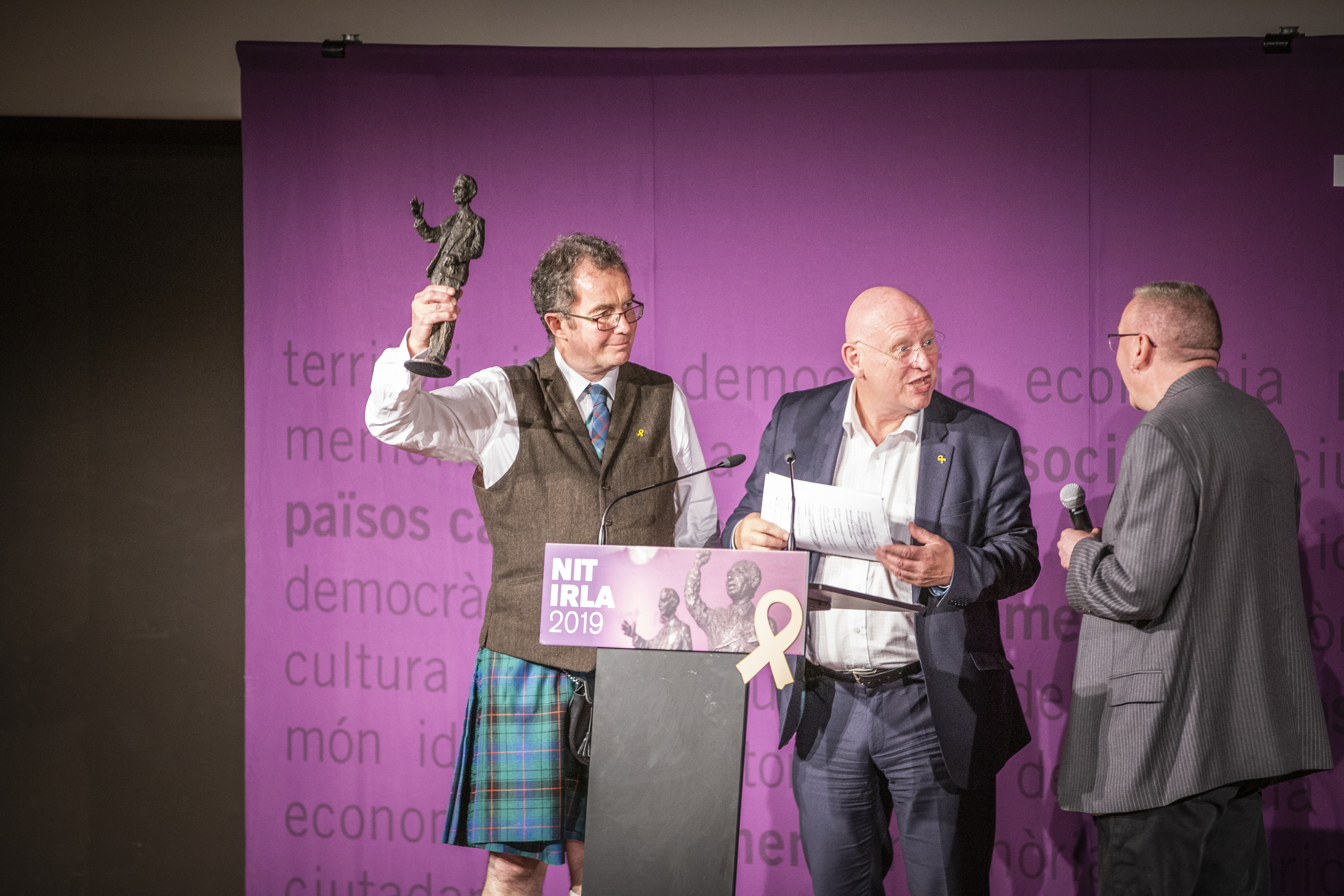
- Chris Bambery (left) with Hywel Williams in Barcelona in 2019.
- Occupations: Political activist, writer
- Employers: Socialist Worker (UK); George Kerevan
- Organizations: Socialist Workers Party (UK); International Socialist Group
- Known for: Politics
- Notable work: A People's History of Scotland (2014 book)
- Website: www.spanglefish.com/chrisbambery/

Chris Bambery is a Scottish political activist, socialist, author, journalist, TV presenter and producer, most recently with the Islam Channel where he hosts their current affairs programme The Report.

Prior to the 2017 UK General Election he was the Parliamentary Assistant to Scottish National Party MP George Kerevan. A leading member of the International Socialist Group, he was a member of the Central Committee of the Socialist Workers Party until 2011 when he resigned from the party.

He is the author of the 2014 book A People's History of Scotland and was the editor of the UK's Socialist Worker newspaper.

== Political activity ==
Bambery is originally from Edinburgh. He was educated at the fee-paying Daniel Stewart's College and the University of Edinburgh, where he was Vice President of the Students' Representative Council.

Bambery began his political career as a member of the International Marxist Group (IMG) in 1972. In 1976, he was one of several Scottish IMG activists who infiltrated the recently established Scottish Labour Party (SLP), a breakaway from the Labour Party, with the intention of using it to co-ordinate the wider labour movement in fighting "the destruction of the welfare state." When the SLP's leader Jim Sillars expelled a number of activists and branches from the party at its first conference in Stirling in October that year, the IMG 'entrists' were among those who formed the Scottish Labour Party (Democratic Wing) in response. Bambery was appointed to the new "breakaway-breakaway" party's steering committee, but following its collapse soon afterwards he resumed his role as an IMG activist, becoming the group's full-time organiser in Glasgow in 1978.

Bambery left the IMG in May 1979, joining the Socialist Workers Party (SWP) seven months later. In 1981, he became the SWP's Glasgow organiser. Two years later, he moved to London as an organiser for the SWP, was elected a member of its Central Committee in 1987 and became its National Organiser shortly afterwards, a position which he held until 2004, when he replaced Chris Harman as editor of Socialist Worker.

In 2001, he led the International Socialist Tendency at the Genoa Group of Eight Summit protest in Italy with fellow SWP member Alex Callinicos.

After considerable political tension within the SWP regarding the party's response to the economic crisis, Bambery made public his resignation letter to SWP National Organiser Charlie Kimber on 11 April 2011. His resignation was joined by 38 other party members, based in Scotland, who shared Bambery's analysis that the SWP had retreated from building a political opposition to austerity and the recession along the lines of the highly successful Stop the War Coalition which the SWP was heavily involved with in its first decade.

Following his resignation from the SWP, Bambery was a founding member of the International Socialist Group, an organisation set up by the 39 former SWP members to formulate a united front approach to the recession and to develop a Left argument for Scottish independence in the 2014 referendum. During the referendum campaign, Bambery supported the Radical Independence Campaign, and was subsequently a supporter of RISE, the Scottish radical left coalition.

== Books ==
In 2014, Bambery's A People's History of Scotland and his The Second World War: A Marxist History were published. A review of the former in The Scotsman stated: "In telling the stories of the ordinary footsoldiers in the Radical War of 1820, of the cotton spinners’ strike of 1837 and of the miners’ struggles from 1840 to 1984, in describing the lives of such as Mary Brooksbank and James Connolly, Bambery offers a Scottish version of E. P. Thompson's The Making of the English Working Class" Brian Morton in The Herald described its "relentless populism" as "tiresome", but concluded that it was "pamphleteering of an attractively old-fashioned sort, but on an ambitious scale... It's to be hoped that Bambery's steady insistence on social justice as a higher political end, above party or nationalism, remains audible."

In The Scotsman, Roger Hutchinson in reviewing the book pointed out:

"Do not, then, approach this book expecting to read more of the pussy-footing academic social history which Scotland already has in abundance. Bambery sets out to prove that all of Scotland’s past has led us, with Marxist inevitability, to the day when the red flag will flutter over Holyrood."

Reviewing the book in Monthly Review, Paul Buhle welcomed it, writing:

"Chris Bambery’s splendid People’s History builds upon the scholarly work of others across several generations, including the renowned Scottish historian Thomas Johnson, but also a wealth of nearly forgotten researchers... One might say, more properly, that this sweeping history builds upon a social and class legacy of resistance rarely understood beyond the borders of this curious land with its staggering natural beauty, desperate poverty, and collective memories."

Professor John Newsinger, author of The Blood Never Dried: A People's History of the British Empire, reviewed The Second World War: A Marxist History thus:

"Chris Bambery’s The Second World War is well-written, in places positively brilliant, covering a lot of ground, laying bare the real motives of the great powers."

Some criticism came from those who maintain a loyalty to the former USSR and did not like the depiction of it as fighting the war with Germany for its own, imperialist interests.

In March 2018 Catalonia Reborn, co-authored by Chris and George Kerevan, was published by Luath Press, and in August 2018 Verso published a new, updated edition of A People's History of Scotland.

Michael Eaude, author of Catalonia: A Cultural History, welcomed Catalonia Reborn, writing:

"The book’s great achievement is to connect these recent events with history and a materialist analysis of the class and national forces in play. Its style is direct and urgent, as befits a book on rapid-moving contemporary events, but it is not superficial. Sometimes, outside eyes can contribute a rounder, fuller picture, especially (as in this case) eyes from Scotland, whose struggle is entwined with Catalonia’s."

Writing about the book in The National, Martin Hannan said of it:

"The book is a sustained indictment of the Spanish government’s dealings with Catalonia, made all the more devastating by the detailed factual nature of the work.

Reviewing it in Planet: The Welsh Internationalist, Ned Thomas, founder of the Mercator Institute for Media, Languages and Culture at Aberystwyth University, said that “Past and present are nicely linked through visits to sites of social memory in the Catalan capital… well-researched, well-structured and well-explained.”

The book was welcomed in the House of Commons, where Plaid Cymru MP Hywel Williams put down an Early Day Motion signed by 11 MPs from Plaid Cymru, the SNP and Labour, stating:

"That this House congratulates Chris Bambery and George Kerevan on the publishing and launch of their book Catalonia Reborn; commends the authors for producing such a detailed and revealing book, given the subject’s complexity and importance to the future of Europe; believes that this is the key text for anyone concerned with the future of Catalonia, Spain and Europe; and hopes that the authors will continue in their work to shed light on developments in Catalonia in the future."

In September 2025 Tippermuir Press published Chris Bambery's The Old Divide: A History of Sectarianism in Scotland - https://tippermuirbooks.co.uk/product/the-old-divide-a-history-of-sectarianism-in-scotland/

Robert Shiels reviewing it in Scottish Legal News wrote:

'Perhaps it is true that there is no good news in history: the excellent work of Chris Bambery, expanding on an acclaimed article on the same theme, supports that point as it applies to the comparatively recent past in Scotland. The bigger picture beyond this place is a loss of religious commitment that may show up comparable criminal and bad behaviour elsewhere.' https://www.scottishlegal.com/articles/review-scotlands-shameful-history-of-sectarianism

In the Morning Star John McInally writes:

Parallels with contemporary anti-immigration racism are unavoidable. A minister at the 1922 General Assembly of the Church of Scotland proclaimed: “Roman Catholics of Irish origin… were not only alien to Scots in religion; they were also alien in race. They had come to Scotland to take jobs from Scottish workers, to exploit Scotland’s welfare resources and to stir labour unions… Irish Catholic men were also seducing innocent Scottish girls into mixed marriages ‘to betray the faith of their fathers’.”

Concluding:

'For its explanation of the class basis for sectarianism and racism alone, this is a book for our times.' https://morningstaronline.co.uk/article/divide-and-rule-scotland

== Bibliography ==
- Scotland's National Question (1995)
- Ireland's Permanent Revolution (1990)
- Scotland - Nation & Class
- Scotland - The Socialist Answer
- Stopping The Nazi Menace - How To Fight The Fascists Today
- Fighting To Change The World
- Ireland - Why The Troops Must Get Out
- Permanent Revolution
- Imperialism
- A Rebel's Guide to Gramsci (2006)
- Gramsci: Hegemony and revolutionary strategy
- Bahrain, British Imperialism
- A People's History of Scotland (2014)
- The Second World War: A Marxist History (2014)
- Catalonia Reborn: How Catalonia Took on the Corrupt Spanish State and the Legacy of Franco (co-authored with George Kerevan) (2018)

The Old Divide: A History of Sectarianism in Scotland, Tippermuir Press, 2025

Media offices
Preceded by Chris Harman	Editor of Socialist Worker; 2004–2009	Succeeded by Charlie Kimber
