= Charlie Kimber =

British politician (born 1957)

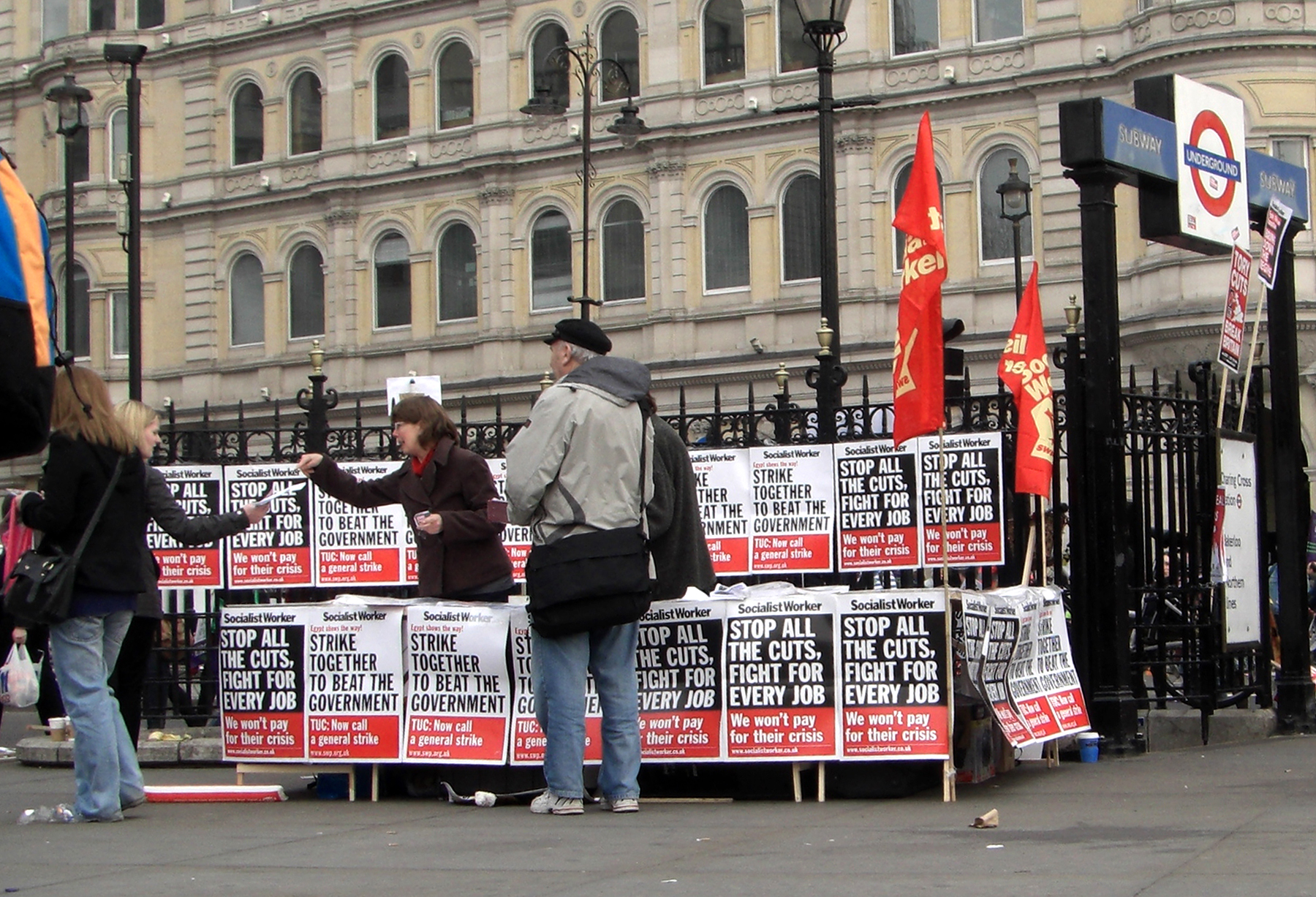
Socialist Workers Party stall, London 2011

Charles Nicholas Kimber (born July 1957) was the National Secretary of the Socialist Workers Party of the United Kingdom from January 2011.

== Career ==
Kimber has been politically active since the 1970s and went on his first protest march in 1975. He is the editor of Socialist Worker newspaper and has also written for International Socialism, the SWP's journal of socialist theory. He is a director of Sherborne Publications Limited, the company that publishes the Socialist Worker, having taken that position following the resignation of Martin Smith as a director on 24 May 2013.

== Writing ==
Kimber has published a number of political works, mostly published by the Socialist Workers Party. In May 2008, during the government of Gordon Brown and the 2008 financial crisis, he produced Pay Cuts, Recession and Resistance, which dealt, among other things, with a cost of living crisis for working people and asked "Do wage rises cause inflation?" Kimber argued that the idea of a wage-price spiral was false as workers' pay rises were a secondary and lagging effect of inflation, not its cause. The cause of inflation, he asserted, was employers trying to maintain their profits in times of falling sales. Other topics covered in the publication include the gap between rich and poor and the need for socialist organisation in order to achieve an economy planned in everyone's interests.

== Selected publications ==
- The Struggle for Workers Power. Socialist Workers Party, 1998. OCLC 31481889
- Arbeidersmacht en Socialisme. Amsterdam: Internationale Socialisten, 1998. OCLC 84837649
- Wales, Class Struggle and Socialism. London: Bookmarks Publications, 1999. ISBN 9781898877196
- Pensions, Profits and Resistance. Socialist Workers Party, 2005. ISBN 9781898877424
- Pay Cuts, Recession and Resistance. Socialist Workers Party, London, 2008. (With Simon Basketter and Yuri Prasad) ISBN 9781905192397
- Immigration: The myths spread to divide us. Socialist Workers Party, 2010. ISBN 9781909026360
- Arguments for Revolution: The case for the Socialist Workers Party. Socialist Workers Party, 2011. (With Joseph Choonara) ISBN 9781905192762
- Jeremy Corbyn Labour and the Fight for Socialism. Socialist Workers Party, 2015.

Media offices
| Preceded by Chris Bambery | Editor of Socialist Worker; 2009–2010 | Succeeded by Judith Orr |
| Preceded by Judith Orr | Editor of Socialist Worker c.2014–present | Succeeded by Incumbent |
