= A People's History of Scotland =

2014 non-fiction book by Chris Bambery

- Author: Chris Bambery
- Subject: History of Scotland
- Genre: Non-fiction
- Publisher: Verso Books
- Publication date: 2014
- Pages: 374
- ISBN: 9781781682845

A People's History of Scotland is a 2014 book by Chris Bambery.

Written from a far left perspective, the book briefly covers Scottish ancient history, before documenting events from the Middle Ages until 2014, focussing on the struggle of workers and Scottish perspectives on the UK's political parties and sense of national identity.

== Publication ==
A People's History of Scotland was published in 2014 by Verso Press. It has 374 pages.

It was written by Trotskyist Chris Bambery.

== Synopsis ==
The book has fifteen chapters before its conclusion. It briefly mentions ancient history before delving into the Middle Ages, documenting the historical urbanisation of Scotland and the role of Scots in British colonisation campaigns. It notes the pattern of a few Scottish urbanites profiting from colonial conquests and sending their earnings to England, rather than benefiting the Scottish people. It notes the rising worker solidarity, from 1880s onwards, comparing the most robust rise of class consciousness with Wales, both more widespread than in England. The book notes the Labour Party leader Ramsay MacDonald's support for austerity measures, costing the party support in Scotland in the 1930s. Bambery writes about the influence of folk music on the Scottish sense of national identity and as a tool to advance pacifism. He also notes the Scottish discomfort with the Communist Party of Britain and the influence of Thatcherite politics, prompting the 1997 Scottish devolution referendum, devolution, and the creation of the Parliament of Scotland. The book notes Scottish "disgust" for the Iraq War amidst wider protests against Tony Blair's "neoliberalism". Bambery describes Scottish National Party opportunism as deceptive, painting the party's politicians as being closer to neoliberalism than they claim. He describes Scottish independence voters as seekers of democracy. The book's conclusion covers the increasing wealth gap in Scotland.

== Critical reception ==
Paul Buhle, writing in Monthly Review, described the book as "splendid". Seán Damer, of Edinburgh University's School of Social and Political Science, described it as "well-written, well-documented, readable and provocative", crediting the author for telling history from the perspective of working-class Scots. He describes the book as being written from a Marxist perspective.The Herald gave the book a mixed review describing it as good and readable, but also characterising it as campaigning ahead of the 2014 independence referendum scheduled a few months after the book's publication.

== See also ==
- Bought & Sold: Scotland, Jamaica and Slavery (2022 book)
- People's history
- Scotland in the Middle Ages
