= Enron: The Smartest Guys in the Room =

2005 documentary film by Alex Gibney

- Theatrical release poster
- Directed by: Alex Gibney
- Written by: Alex Gibney
- Based on: The Smartest Guys in the Room by Bethany McLean; Peter Elkind
- Produced by: Alex Gibney; Jason Kliot; Susan Motamed; Alison Ellwood
- Narrated by: Peter Coyote
- Cinematography: Maryse Alberti
- Edited by: Alison Ellwood
- Music by: Matthew Hauser
- Production companies: 2929 Entertainment; HDNet Films; Jigsaw Productions
- Distributed by: Magnolia Pictures
- Release date: April 22, 2005
- Running time: 109 minutes
- Country: United States
- Language: English
- Budget: $700,000
- Box office: $4.9 million

Enron: The Smartest Guys in the Room is a 2005 American documentary film based on the best-selling 2003 book of the same name by Fortune reporters Bethany McLean and Peter Elkind, who are credited as writers of the film alongside the director, Alex Gibney. It examines the 2001 collapse of the Enron Corporation, which resulted in criminal trials for several of the company's top executives during the ensuing Enron scandal, and contains a section about the involvement of Enron traders in the 2000-01 California electricity crisis. Archival footage is used alongside new interviews with McLean and Elkind, several former Enron executives and employees, stock analysts, reporters, and former governor of California Gray Davis.

The film won the awards for Best Documentary Feature at the 21st Independent Spirit Awards and Best Documentary Screenplay at the 58th Writers Guild of America Awards. It was nominated for the Academy Award for Best Documentary Feature at the 78th Academy Awards.

== Synopsis ==
The film begins with a profile of Kenneth Lay, who founded Enron in 1985. In 1987, the company becomes embroiled in scandal after two traders begin betting on the oil markets, resulting in suspiciously consistent profits. One of the traders, Louis Borget, is also discovered to be diverting company money to offshore accounts. Auditors uncover their wrongdoing, but Lay encourages them to "keep making us millions". However, the traders are fired when it is revealed they gambled away Enron's reserves and the company is narrowly saved from bankruptcy by executive Mike Muckleroy, who managed to bluff the market long enough to recover Borget's trading losses. Lay later denies having knowledge of any wrongdoing. Lay hires Jeffrey Skilling, a visionary who joins Enron on the condition that they use mark-to-market accounting, allowing the company to record potential profits on certain projects immediately after contracts were signed, regardless of the actual profits made. With the vision of transforming Enron from an energy supplier to an energy trader, Skilling imposes his speculative financial worldview on Enron. Skilling also hires J. Clifford Baxter, an intelligent but manic-depressive executive, and Lou Pai, the CEO of Enron Energy Services, notorious for his nightly habit of visiting strip clubs. Pai abruptly resigns from EES, having already sold $250 million of stock as a result of divorce proceedings.

With its success in the bull market brought on by the dot-com bubble, Enron seeks to beguile stock market analysts by meeting their projections. Executives push up their stock prices and then cash in their multimillion-dollar options, a process known as "pump and dump". Enron also mounts a PR campaign to portray itself as a profitable, prosperous, and innovative company, even though its worldwide operations are performing poorly. Elsewhere, Enron begins ambitious initiatives, such as attempts to use broadband technology to deliver movies on demand and to "trade weather" like a commodity. Both initiatives fail, but, using mark-to-market accounting, Enron is able to record non-existent profits for these ventures. CFO Andrew Fastow creates a network of shell companies designed solely to do business with Enron, for the ostensible dual purposes of sending Enron money and hiding its increasing debt. Fastow also pressures Wall Street investment banks into investing in these shell entities. However, Fastow has a vested financial stake in these ventures and uses them to defraud Enron of tens of millions of dollars in business deals that he effectively conducts with himself. All of this is done with the permission of Enron's accounting firm Arthur Andersen and Enron's corporate board. Most of these deals were leveraged with Enron stock, meaning that a significant decline in their stock price could cause Fastow's network of shell companies to fall apart. During this time, Enron's executives encourage employees to invest their savings and retirement funds into Enron stock while they are selling off their shares for millions.

Enron's successes continue as it becomes one of the few internet-related companies to survive the burst of the dot-com bubble in 2000 relatively unscathed, and it is named the "most admired" corporation by Fortune magazine for the sixth year running. However, Jim Chanos, an Enron investor, and Bethany McLean, a Fortune reporter, question irregularities about the company's financial statements and stock value. Skilling responds by calling McLean "unethical", though he does send three Enron executives to meet with McLean and her Fortune editor to explain the company's finances. When McLean's critical article is published, Skilling accuses Fortune of just trying to counteract a recent positive piece about Enron in BusinessWeek, Fortune's competitor.

Public perception of Enron begins to change due to its role in the 2000–'01 California electricity crisis. Given the company's purchase of Portland General Electric in 1997, Enron traders are able to exploit California's newly deregulated energy market by creating artificial energy shortages, making the company $2 billion. The film includes tape-recorded conversations between Enron traders who seem to derive enjoyment from this, citing the Milgram experiment to explain their behavior. It also explores the strong political connections Ken Lay and Enron had, particularly to the administrations of President George H. W. Bush and his son, President (and earlier governor of Texas), George W. Bush, and suggests that the Bush administration's lack of response during the California energy crisis could have been intended as a means of sabotaging then-governor of California Gray Davis, who was speculated to be a strong potential challenger to the younger Bush in the 2004 Presidential election. Indeed, the crisis was a contributing factor to Davis being recalled in 2003, which ended his political career. Skilling, who succeeded Lay as Enron's CEO on February 12, 2001, blames California's energy laws for the crisis and denies that Enron is acting inappropriately, infamously stating in a 2001 episode of Frontline that "We are the good guys. We are on the side of angels." Eventually, the Democratic-controlled United States Senate ends the crisis by imposing price controls. Bush's connections to Ken Lay come under scrutiny in the press, which intensifies after Enron's collapse.

Meanwhile, throughout 2001, much more scrutiny is brought upon Enron's balance sheet. This agitates Skilling, leading him to engage in odd and irrational behavior, such as calling an investor an "asshole" during a conference call. This culminates in Skilling's abrupt resignation as CEO in August 2001, after which Ken Lay retakes the position. Skilling's odd behavior serves as a red flag to investors, who begin to question how financially healthy the company really is. Soon after Skilling's departure, whistleblower Sherron Watkins discovers the fraud in Enron's books and alerts Lay, telling him the company is headed to certain collapse unless he acts immediately. Like in 1987, Lay largely ignores the warnings and assures that Skilling left for personal reasons and the company is financially solid. The board fires CFO Fastow after discovering he had embezzled more than $30 million from the company through his shell companies. With Fastow gone, Enron's accountants issue restatements that erase a majority of the company's profits from 1997 through 2000, add nearly $1 billion of debt to the company's balance sheet, and remove over $1 billion of shareholder equity as a means of writing down the losses from Fastow's shell companies. Despite Lay's continued assurances that Enron is in good shape and will pull through, the company's stock price tanks as its investors and customers lose all confidence, forcing Enron to file for Chapter 11 bankruptcy protection in November 2001.

As a result of Enron's bankruptcy, many of its employees lose their pensions and life savings, while investors lose over $11 billion in shareholder value. Skilling testifies at the ensuing congressional hearings, but Ken Lay and Andrew Fastow plead the fifth. Fastow eventually pleads guilty and agrees to testify against his former coworkers in exchange for a reduced sentence, while Lay and Skilling plead innocent and spend tens of millions of dollars on defense attorneys, with their trials scheduled to take place in 2006.

== Cast ==
- Peter Coyote, narrator
- Bethany McLean, Fortune reporter; co-author, The Smartest Guys in the Room
- Peter Elkind, co-author, The Smartest Guys in the Room
- Sherron Watkins, ex-vice president, Enron Corp.; Enron whistleblower; co-author, Power Failure
- Mimi Swartz, executive editor, Texas Monthly magazine; co-author, Power Failure
- Mike Muckleroy, former Enron executive
- Amanda Martin, former Enron executive
- Charles Wickman, former Enron trader
- Colin Whitehead, former Enron trader
- John Beard, former Enron accountant
- Max Eberts, former spokesman, Enron Energy Services
- Carol Coale, senior vice president and senior research analyst, Prudential Securities
- Bill Lerach, attorney for Enron stockholders
- Gray Davis, former governor of California
- David Freeman, former advisor to Governor Davis
- Philip H. Hilder, Sherron Watkins' attorney

== Reception ==
Enron: The Smartest Guys in the Room received positive reviews. It has a rating of 97% on Rotten Tomatoes, based on 119 reviews, with an average rating of 8.09/10; the site's consensus states: "A concise, entertaining documentary about the spectacular failure of Enron." On Metacritic, the film has a rating of 82%, based on 37 reviews.

Film critic Roger Ebert, writing in the Chicago Sun-Times, gave the film three-and-a-half out of four, commenting that: "This is not a political documentary. It is a crime story. No matter what your politics, Enron: The Smartest Guys in the Room will make you mad". Ebert's co-host on the television program Ebert & Roeper, Chicago Tribune critic Richard Roeper, said the film is "a brilliantly executed, brutally entertaining dissection of what one observer called the greatest corporate fraud in American history". A. O. Scott of The New York Times wrote that: "This sober, informative chronicle of the biggest business scandal of the decade is almost indecently entertaining." Owen Gleiberman called the film: "A nimble investigative workout that leaves you with the exhilarated sensation of understanding the defining financial scandal of the virtual era."

The film won the award for Best Documentary Screenplay at the 58th Writers Guild of America Awards and was nominated for the Academy Award for Best Documentary Feature at the 78th Academy Awards, but lost to March of the Penguins.

== See also ==
- The Corporation (2003 film)
- Conspiracy of Fools (2005 book)
- Fun with Dick and Jane (1977)
- Fun with Dick and Jane (2005 remake)
