= Radical Independence Campaign =

Pro-Scottish independence organisation

Radical Independence Campaign Neo-eisimeileachd Radaigeach
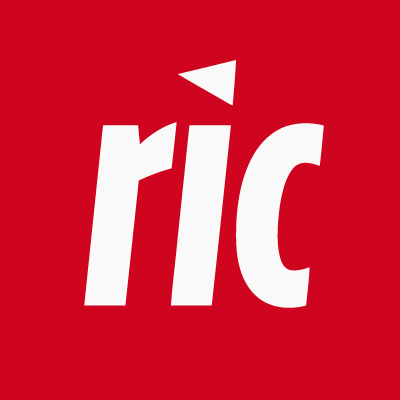
- Abbreviation: RIC
- Formation: 12 November 2012
- Founded at: Glasgow, Scotland
- Purpose: Scottish independence Scottish republicanism Democracy; Secularism; Environmentalism
- Location: Scotland
- Website: ric.scot

The Radical Independence Campaign (RIC) is an organisation which advocates for Scotland to become a republic, independent of the United Kingdom.

It was established in 2012 in the run-up to the 2014 Scottish independence referendum, in which it played a significant campaigning role.

== Mission ==
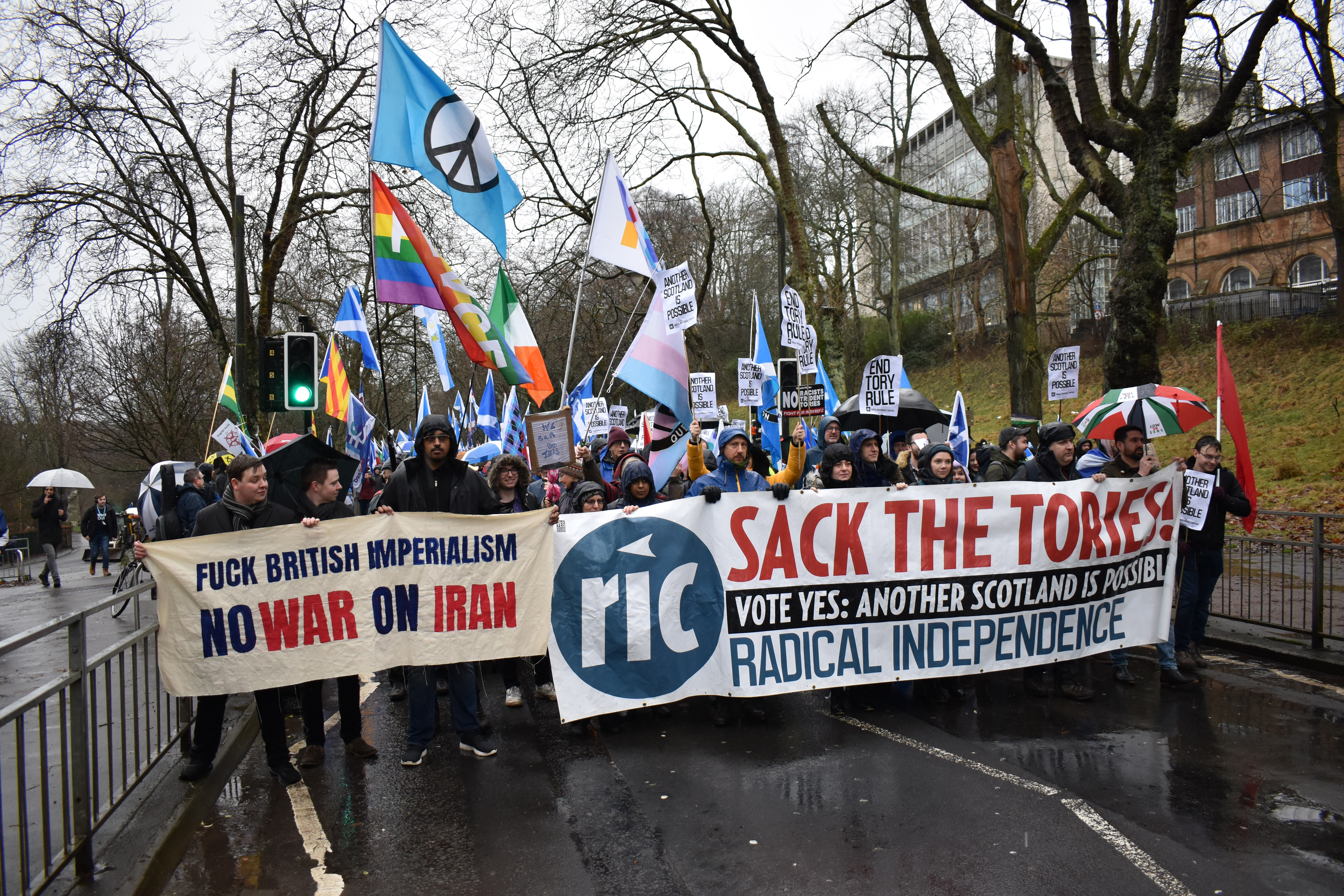
RIC supporters at a march in support of Scottish independence, January 2020.

RIC stands for the following:

- For a democratic, secular, socially just and environmentally sustainable Scottish republic.
- Action based on the sovereignty of the people not the UK Crown, leading to the setting up of a Constituent Assembly.
- Action to establish universal health care, education, housing, income, pensions and trade union rights; and to win land reform and challenge environmental degradation.
- Equality and opposition to discrimination on grounds of sex, gender, sexuality, race, ethnicity, religion/belief, disability or age.
- Solidarity with the struggles for workers’ rights, democracy and self-determination, based on internationalism from below.
- Support for Scotland’s artistic and cultural revival in all its languages.

== History ==
=== 2012–2014 ===
During the 2012–2014 Scottish independence campaign, RIC emerged from the Radical Independence Conference 2012 that was attended by almost 900 people. During the run-up to the 2014 Scottish independence referendum, RIC conducted a voter registration drive. This contributed to the unprecedented high voter registration of 84.59%.

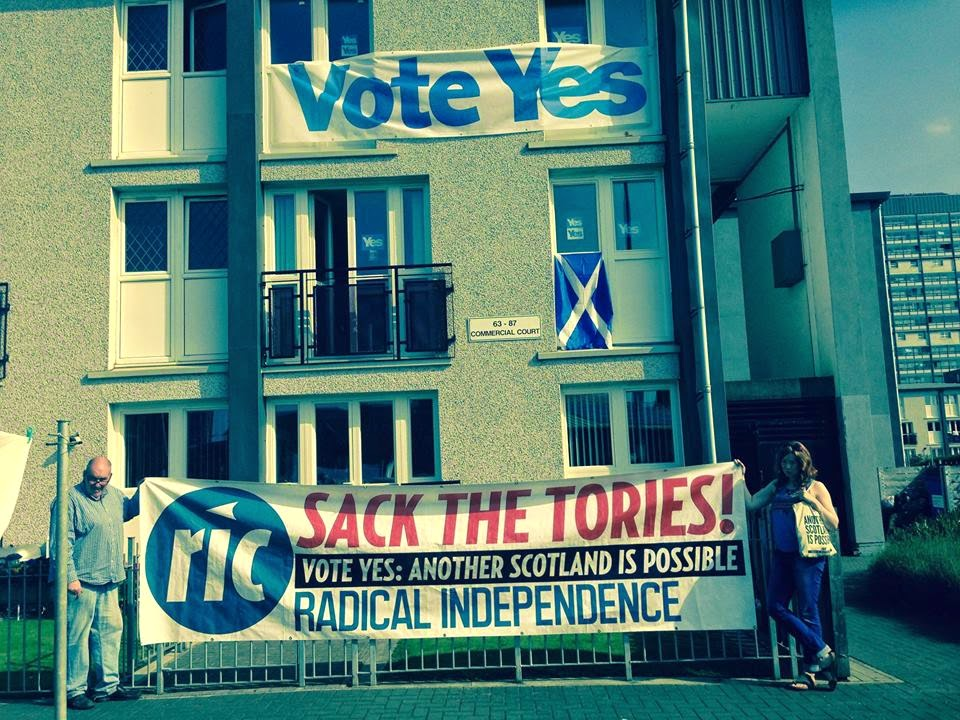
Canvassing prior to the 2014 referendum.

RIC has also conducted non-violent direct action protests. An example of this which was prominent in the media is when right-wing UKIP leader Nigel Farage was unable to promote his views due to RIC supporters disrupting an Edinburgh election meeting.

In November 2013, RIC hosted the Radical Independence Conference 2013, which brought over 1,000 delegates to Glasgow to hear a left-wing vision for independence. Speakers included Scottish Green co-convenor Patrick Harvie, Yes Scotland chairman Dennis Canavan, human rights lawyer Aamer Anwar, Scottish Socialist spokesman Colin Fox, actor David Hayman and youth activist Cat Boyd. In November 2013, George Kerevan commented on the conference, saying: "RIC is the wild card in next year’s referendum. If the anti-austerity left can convince Scotland’s young people that independence means genuine change, all political bets are off."

RIC commenced a strategy that targeted economically disadvantaged areas of Scotland in late February 2014, with organisers explaining that mainstream politics were not relevant to the residents of these areas. To launch the action, RIC members distributed flyers and posters in social housing schemes that read: "Britain is for the rich, Scotland can be ours". RIC organiser Jonathon Shafi said to the Sunday Herald newspaper on 23 February 2014 that he had encountered three-to-one support for an independent Scotland and stated:

Change is in the air. We are on the verge of a wider awakening. Corporate Britain is sewn up for the rich. Most people know they are the butt of Tory Britain's 'we're all in it together' joke. It will not take much to galvanise that frustration into a clear understanding of just how bad Britain has been.

Whilst the 2014 Scottish independence referendum did not lead to independence, the independence cause proved popular among the working-class. This was demonstrated by the Scottish Labour Party losing forty of their forty-one Scottish seats to the SNP in the 2015 United Kingdom general election.

=== 2014–2021 ===
In June 2014, the Sunday Herald reported that "informal" discussions had taken place between figures in the Radical Independence Campaign and the Scottish Socialist Party with regards to creating a new left-wing party in the wake of the independence referendum. These discussions led to the RISE political party which stood unsuccessfully in the 2016 Scottish Parliament election and which has now dissolved.

=== 2021 onwards ===
In early 2021, it was announced that RIC had disbanded as a national body, but that 'some local groups may still choose to operate under the RIC name'. This opened up a new era in RIC's history, by giving an impetus to those local groups to renew the campaign as a whole.

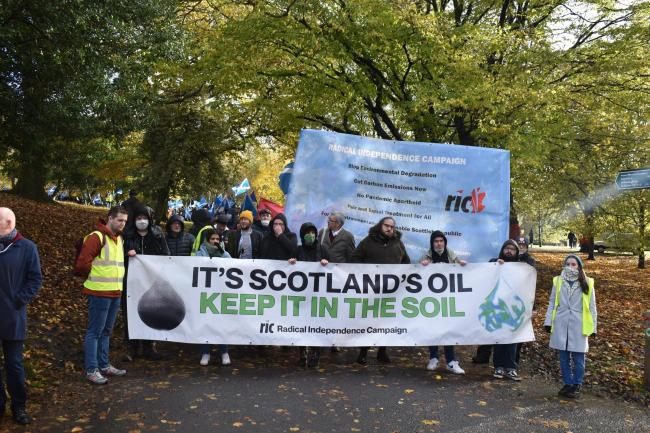
RIC at COP26, November 2021.

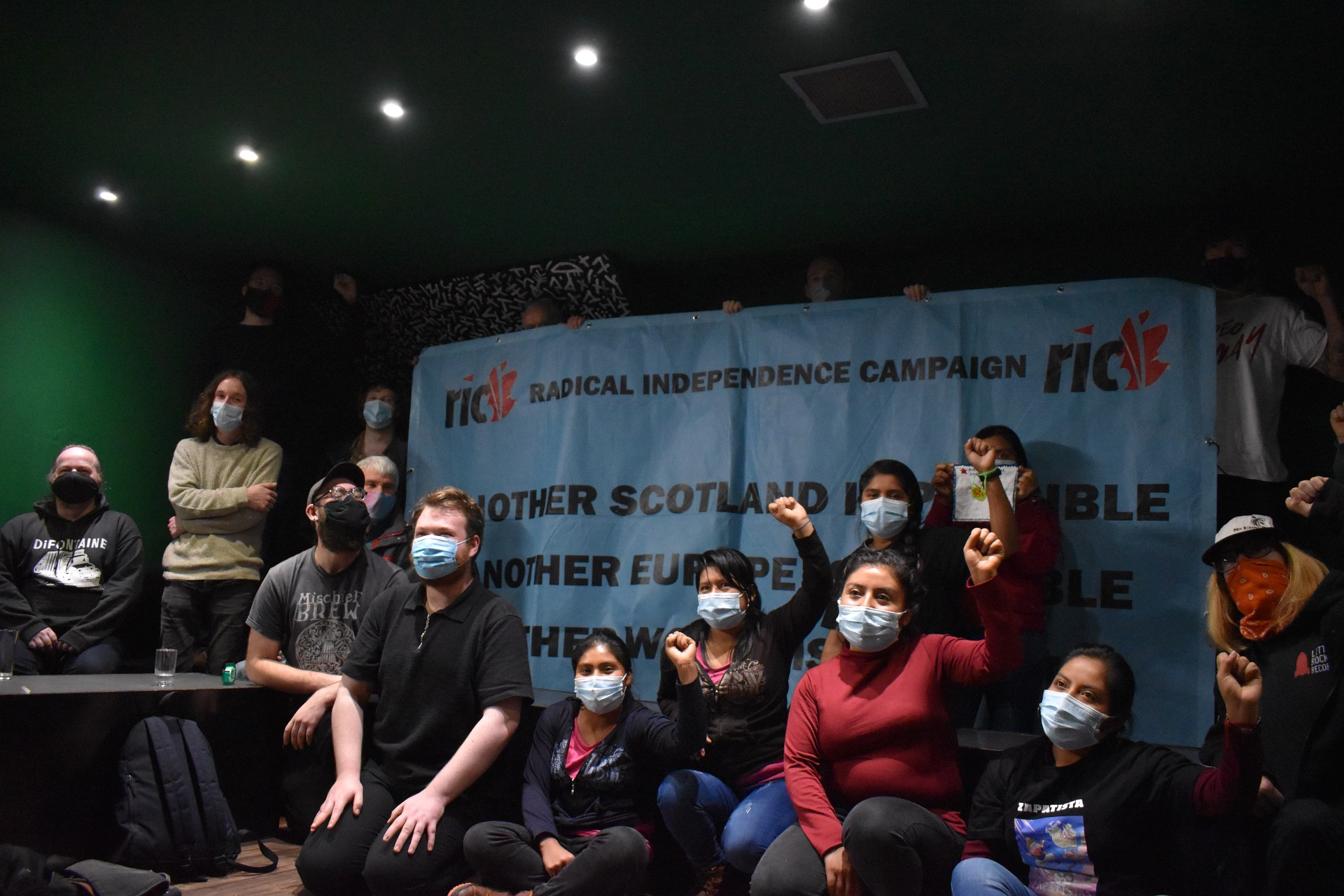
Zapatista delegates at a RIC meeting, November 2021.

In late April 2021 it was reported that the group was "alive" and preparing for a potential second Scottish independence referendum. Hustings were organised in the run-up to the May 2021 Scottish Parliament election. An online Radical Independence Conference was held in June 2021, offering workshops on planning acts of civil disobedience to pressure the UK Government. During the UN COP26 climate change conference in Glasgow, on 6 November, RIC organised the independence bloc of the Global Day of Action for Climate Justice march, which was the city's largest protest in nearly two decades. The group organised under the slogan "It’s Scotland’s oil, keep it in the soil". RIC also used COP26 as an opportunity to network with self-determination activists from other stateless nations which were excluded from the official UN conference.

In November 2021, the group announced that it sought to intensify its international links. This includes the Scottish diaspora globally, other nations in Britain and Ireland, and further afield. For example, RIC has proposed an All-Island International group, which it would be a part of alongside other pro-independence organisations in Wales, Cornwall and the north of England, as well as groups promoting Irish unification.

RIC member Jack Ferguson said to The National newspaper on 7 November 2021 that:

RIC sees international links as vital so that we can offer our support to people struggling around the world, but also so that Scotland can call on global help when demanding our own right to self-determination from Westminster. We’re also seeking to build links with the Scottish diaspora globally, encouraging them to support the independence struggle here [in Scotland]. We want to come together in alliance with all those throughout these islands who see breaking up the British state as the way to achieve major social progress, and work together to end the undemocratic rule of Westminster.

== Criticism ==
Critics of the campaign included George Galloway and Lord Forsyth. Galloway accused a RIC-organised protest directed at Nigel Farage, a Member of the European Parliament (MEP), of having an "anti-English character", while Forsyth called it "a very bad advertisement for Scotland".

After the beginning of the "Britain is for the rich, Scotland can be ours" strategy, the RIC was criticised by both the Labour Party and the Conservative Party, with the former calling the strategy "appalling" and the latter claiming that it is motivated by "hatred". Shadow Scottish secretary Margaret Curran criticised RIC for "appalling tactics", and requested clarification from the SNP and Yes Scotland in regard to whether they approved RIC's actions. In response, a Scottish National Party (SNP) spokesperson informed the media that the RIC is organisationally separate from both the SNP and the Yes Scotland alliance.

== See also ==
- Common Weal
- National Collective
- Republican Communist Network
- RISE – Scotland's Left Alliance
- Scottish Campaign for Nuclear Disarmament
- Scottish Green Party
- Scottish independence
- Scottish republicanism
- Scottish Socialist Party
- Scottish Socialist Youth
