= RISE – Scotland's Left Alliance =

- Leader: Jonathon Shafi
- Founded: 29 August 2015
- Dissolved: 6 November 2020
- Headquarters: 11 Moorfield Road; Blantyre; G72 0RH
- Ideology: Anti-capitalism; Eco-socialism; Scottish independence Scottish republicanism
- Political position: Left-wing
- Colours: Orange, red and white

RISE – Scotland's Left Alliance was a left-wing electoral alliance and political party created ahead of the 2016 Scottish Parliament general election. The name was a contrived acronym standing for Respect, Independence, Socialism and Environmentalism. The Party name was registered as 'RISE - Respect, Independence, Socialism and Environmentalism'. The party was deregistered in November 2020.

The alliance was formally established at a conference in Glasgow on 29 August 2015. The Scottish Socialist Party affiliated to the alliance for the 2016 election, in which RISE fielded candidates on the regional list in all electoral regions, but none were elected.

== History ==

Shortly after the Scottish independence referendum, the Scottish Left Project was launched online in October 2014 as a "grassroots forum for left-wing ideas and talent". Its website contained an "opening statement" signed by 22 activists, which others on the left were encouraged to sign.

The initial signatories included members of the International Socialist Group, a splinter from the Socialist Workers Party (SWP) whose figureheads, Cat Boyd and Jonathon Shafi, emerged as the SLP's principal spokespersons, and some members of the Scottish Socialist Party (SSP). The statement called for a "co-ordinated socialist challenge" in the 2016 elections and included commitments to "crowdsource policies" and hold "a citizens' audit of the debt that is imprisoning our national finances".

The SSP later joined negotiations to create an electoral alliance with other participants in the Scottish Left Project. Former MSP Frances Curran was among prominent SSP members arguing for participation in the proposed alliance, while Allan Grogan and Liam McLaughlan, who became prominent over the course of the referendum campaign, were among 38 members who signed an open letter arguing against the move, stating that there "are no shortcuts to building a strong left-wing opposition".

The Herald reported after the vote that the new alliance was "likely to be dominated by the SSP", who would be the largest component of a new arrangement. In July 2015, the Republican Communist Network, which organised within the SSP until 2012, added its support.

On 7 June 2015, the Sunday Herald revealed that the name of the electoral alliance would be RISE – Scotland's Left Alliance. An inaugural conference was held at the Glasgow Marriott on Saturday 29 August.

The inaugural conference was addressed by speakers including the author Alan Bissett, SSP spokesperson Colin Fox and Independent MSP Jean Urquhart.

A further conference was arranged to be held in December to establish the alliance's policy platform and structure. At this conference they announced their intention to field candidates in all regions of Scotland.

The Scottish Socialist Party (SSP) had been affiliated with the alliance for the Scottish Parliament election 2016, but otherwise retains its autonomy as an independent political party.

In December 2015, former Scottish National Party (SNP) depute leader Jim Sillars said he would support the SNP with his constituency vote and RISE with his regional vote, adding: "If Colin Fox is on the list for Rise, I will be voting and supporting Colin Fox on the list system."

In early January 2016, RISE announced its regional lists candidates for seven electoral regions. A RISE candidate in the Lothian region later resigned, following concerns being expressed about her involvement with the defamation and perjury trials of Tommy Sheridan.

In April 2016 they released their manifesto. The party set out their vision of a Trident-free independent Scottish republic.

At the 2016 election, they polled 10,911 in total across Scotland and none of their candidates were returned. The SSP has since decided to re-evaluate and re-focus away from RISE and instead work on growing its own influence and authority. In September 2016, RISE announced plans to make politics more accessible, including regular political-themed dance club events and a new website. In May 2017, the party unsuccessfully stood one candidate in the Motherwell West ward, at the North Lanarkshire Council election.

In October 2017, the alliance established Conter, a "cross-party site designed for and by Scottish anti-capitalists", with an editorial board composed of non-affiliated socialists and supporters of RISE, Labour, the Scottish Greens, the SSP and others. Writing in Red Pepper, editor Jonathan Rimmer said the site would have "no party line" and called on socialists to "debate with each other on an amicable basis".

On the 6 November 2020, the alliance was statutorily deregistered with the Electoral Commission.

== Electoral performance ==
=== Scottish Parliament ===
Election	# of 2nd votes	% of 2nd vote	# of overall seats won	+/-	Position	Outcome	Notes
2016	10,911	0.5 (#9)	0 / 129	0	—	Not in Parliament	

== See also ==
- List of advocates of republicanism in the United Kingdom
- RISE (Ireland)
