= A People's History of Computing in the United States =

2018 book by Joy Lisi Rankin

A People’s History of Computing in the United States
- Author: Joy Lisi Rankin
- Publisher: Harvard University Press
- Publication date: 2018
- Pages: 336
- ISBN: 9780674970977

A People’s History of Computing in the United States is a non-fiction book by Joy Lisi Rankin. It focuses on American students and educators in the 1960s and 1970s, in particular, those at Dartmouth College, in the Minnesota education system, and at the University of Illinois. Rankin is especially interested in countering the "Silicon Valley mythology" and showing how "computing citizens" created their own networks and fostered a sense of computing for the public good, which she compares to today's "computing consumers".
