= Hidden Histories of Gender and the State in Latin America =

2000 collection of essays

- Editor: Elizabeth Dore and Maxine Molyneux
- Publisher: Duke University Press
- Publication date: 2000

Hidden Histories of Gender and the State in Latin America is a collection of non-fiction essays about the history of women in post-colonial through 20th century Latin American society. Published in 2000 by Duke University Press, it was edited by Elizabeth Dore and Maxine Molyneux, and contains essays written by Elizabeth Dore, Maxine Molyneux, Eugenia Rodríguez, Maria Eugenia Chaves, Rebecca A. Earle, Donna J. Guy, Mary Kay Vaughan, Laura Gotkowitz, Ann Varley, Karin Rosemblatt, Jo Fisher, and Fiona McCaulay.

== General references ==
- Chambers, Sarah C. (2002). "Hidden Histories of Gender and the State in Latin America (review)". Hispanic American Historical Review. 82 (4): 806–808. ISSN 1527-1900.
- Jaquette, Jane (August 2001). "Elizabeth Dore and Maxine Molyneux (eds.), Hidden Histories of Gender and the State in Latin America (Durham, NC, and London: Duke University Press, 2000), pp. xiii+381, £14.95 pb". Journal of Latin American Studies. 33 (3): 611–671. doi:10.1017/S0022216X01216174. ISSN 0022-216X.
- Weslander, Liz (2001). "Hidden Histories of Gender and the State in Latin America (review)". Arizona Journal of Hispanic Cultural Studies. 5 (1): 274–275.
