= Bought & Sold: Scotland, Jamaica and Slavery =

2022 non-fiction book by Kate Phillips

- Author: Kate Phillips
- Genre: Non-fiction, history
- Published: Edinburgh, Scotland
- Publisher: Luath Press
- Publication date: 2022
- ISBN: 9781910022559

Bought & Sold - Scotland, Jamaica and Slavery is a 2022 non-fiction book by Kate Phillips. It documents the role of Scottish people and Scottish companies in the Atlantic slave trade between 1707 and 1834.

== Publication and author ==
Bought & Sold was written by Kate Phillips, a retired social development specialist from Glasgow University. It was published by Luath Press in 2022. Phillips used old newspaper reports, and records of parliamentary debates to inform her writing.

The dust jacket of the book quotes Geoff Palmer: "No human being should be 'bought and sold' but this powerful book describes the buying and selling of black people as chattel slaves and the terrible consequences or this legal trade".

== Synopsis ==
The book documents the deep extent to which Scottish people were involved in, and profiting from, the Atlantic slave trade, with specific focus on Jamaica. It highlights that Scotland undertook a leading role in slavery in the 18th and early 19th century. It details how Scottish companies and Scottish entrepreneurs benefited from the slave trade, starting after the 1707 Acts of Union with England. Examples of the profiteers include leading Scottish families: the Malcolms of Argyll, the Hamiltons of Ayrshire, and the Oswalds of Glasgow. It notes that almost 50% of the slave traders in Jamaica were Scottish men, who owned and abused slaves, fathering thousands of children, often born from rape. It points out that Scottish men, despite representing about 10% of the United Kingdom's population, represented about a third of British slave traders.

The book notes that after decades of ideological debate, the slave trade ended in 1834, with compensation payments being paid to slave owners. It describes modern racism in Scotland as a legacy of slavery, and it notes the modern tendency for Scottish people to be more comfortable talking about the Scottish role in slavery abolition rather than acknowledging the Scottish role in slavery.

== Critical reception ==
Joyce McMillan, writing in The Scotsman described the book as "vitally important", "comprehensive", and "breathtaking".

== See also ==
- A People's History of Scotland (2014 book)
