= The Smartest Guys in the Room (book) =

2003 non-fiction book

- Author: Bethany McLean, Peter Elkind
- Original title: The Smartest Guys in the Room: The Amazing Rise and Scandalous Fall of Enron
- Language: English
- Subject: Corporate Law, Ethics, fall of Enron
- Genre: Non-Fiction
- Publisher: Portfolio Trade
- Publication date: October 13, 2003
- Publication place: United States
- Media type: Hardcover
- Pages: 464
- ISBN: 978-1-59184-053-4

The Smartest Guys in the Room: The Amazing Rise and Scandalous Fall of Enron is a book by Bethany McLean and Peter Elkind, first published in 2003 by Portfolio Trade. In 2005, it was adapted into a documentary film, Enron: The Smartest Guys in the Room.

McLean and Elkind worked on the book when they both were Fortune senior writers. McLean had written a March 5, 2001 article for Fortune called, "Is Enron overpriced?"

The book is not only about the Enron scandal, but also describes the authors' effort in following the developing story as it happened. It is based on hundreds of interviews and details from personal calendars, performance reviews, e-mails, and other documents. BusinessWeek called it, "The best book about the Enron debacle to date."

It hit the New York Times bestseller list and was named one of strategy+business magazine's best business books of 2003.
