= Cat Boyd =

Scottish activist

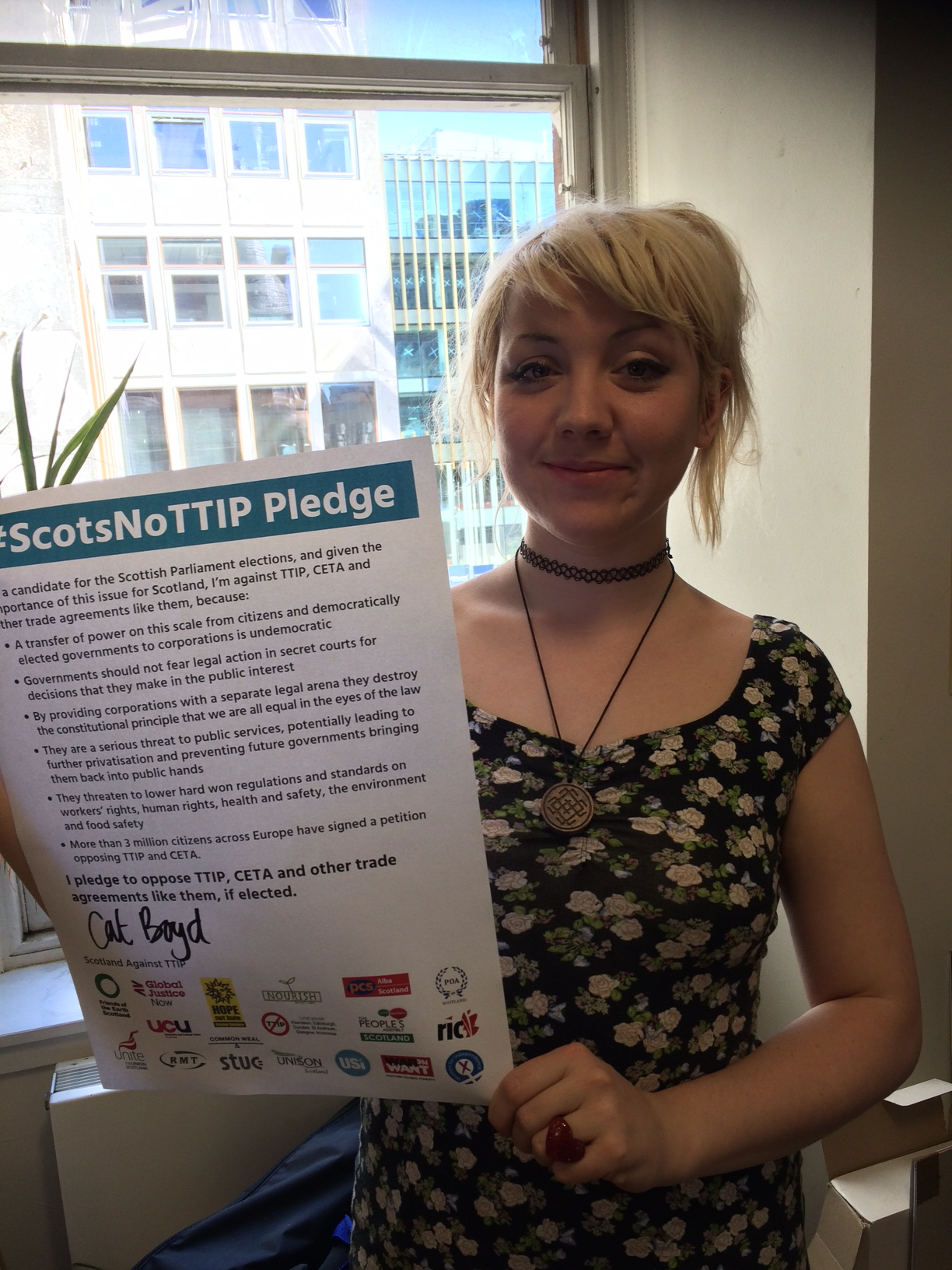
- Cat Boyd in April 2016 holding her signed pledge in opposition to TTIP
- Education: University of Strathclyde

Cat Boyd is a Scottish trade union activist and a co-founder of the Radical Independence Campaign and RISE – Scotland's Left Alliance.

== Background ==
Boyd studied economics and Spanish at the University of Strathclyde. Her mother, Isabelle Boyd, is a former headteacher who was also the Assistant Chief Executive for Education, Youth and Communities at North Lanarkshire Council, and accepted a CBE in 2009.

== Activist ==
It was during the campaign ahead of the 2014 Scottish independence referendum that Boyd emerged as a prominent activist. In November 2012, she co-founded the Radical Independence Campaign, which supported a left-wing vision of an independent Scotland. Boyd also sat on the editorial board of the Scottish Left Review.

While the outcome of the referendum was "No" to independence, the months that followed saw a new coalition forming–the Scottish Left Project. Boyd described the project not as a party but as a way to link up with other socialists, community activists, trade unions, social justice campaigners, and activists.

On 17 November 2016, Boyd made her first appearance on BBC Question Time where she condemned the 2016 vote for Brexit, then divulged that she herself had not voted in the EU referendum, which was met by jeers from the audience.

In July 2017, during an appearance on a television programme, Boyd said that she had voted for the Labour Party at the 2017 UK general election. She later articulated that for that election she saw herself as a pro-independence Corbyn supporter.

== RISE ==
Boyd co-founded the Scottish Left Project, which became RISE – Scotland's Left Alliance, a left-wing electoral alliance created ahead of the 2016 Scottish Parliament election. She stood, unsuccessfully, as a RISE candidate for the 2016 Scottish Parliament election on the Glasgow regional list. RISE did not gain any seats in the 2016 election.

Boyd was seen as a spokesperson as speculation grew around a socialist challenge being formed for the Scottish Parliament elections in 2016, having been involved with protests against austerity and appearing at The Left Field at the 2015 Glastonbury Festival. She had cited the need for a new left-wing force on the basis that she considered the Labour Party to have collapsed.

She also spoke against involving figures like Tommy Sheridan who had been seen as divisive. She was hopeful about momentum of the project in reviving a socialist movement in Scotland. After the alliance was launched at the end of August, with support from the Scottish Socialist Party, Boyd said she thought RISE would appeal to ex-Labour voters.

In January 2016, RISE announced that they had selected Boyd as a candidate for the Scottish Parliament election in 2016 and that she would top their regional list for Glasgow. RISE did not gain any seats nationally, polling just 1% in Glasgow and coming in eighth (behind Sheridan's Solidarity movement).

== Writer ==
Boyd co-wrote Scottish Independence: A Feminist Response with Jenny Morrison, a book published in 2014, exploring the contemporary relevance of Scottish feminist history. On the 2015 International Women's Day, she spoke about women and the referendum at a meeting at Sinn Féin's Ard Fheis.

She has also been an advocate of social justice and internationalism.

Boyd writes a weekly column that is published in The National newspaper.
