= Republican Communist Network =

The Republican Communist Network is a communist political organisation in Scotland. It was a founding member of the Scottish Socialist Party in 1998, though formally disaffiliated from the party in 2012. It is an active participant in the Radical Independence Campaign.

The party publishes a journal called Emancipation and Liberation.
