= Bought & Sold (book) =

2016 memoir by Megan Stephens

- First edition
- Author: Megan Stephens
- Language: English
- Published: 2016
- Publisher: HarperCollins
- Publication place: United Kingdom
- ISBN: 978-0-00-759407-8

Bought & Sold is a 2016 memoir book by Megan Stephens and published by HarperCollins.

== Synopsis ==
Bought & Sold is memoir by Megan Stephens about her experiences as a 14 year old girl who fell in love and was sold in sexual slavery by her pimp boyfriend.
