= Secret History =

Secret History may refer to:

== Literature ==
- The Secret History, a novel by Donna Tartt
- Ash: A Secret History, a novel by Mary Gentle
- Secret History (book series), a fantasy/science fiction series by Simon R. Green
- The Secret History of the Mongols, a 13th-century Mongol chronicle
- Secret Histories, a Doctor Who anthology edited by Mark Clapham
- Secret History, an account of the court of Justinian I by Procopius
- A Secret History, a 2001 book by Alistair Taylor
- Mistborn: Secret History, a 2016 novella by Brandon Sanderson

== Music ==
- The Secret History (band), a New York City-based band
- A Secret History... The Best of the Divine Comedy, an album

== Other uses ==
- Secret History (TV series), a British television documentary series
- Secret History (Canadian TV series), a Canadian television documentary series

== See also ==
- Hidden history (disambiguation)
- People's history (disambiguation)
