= Joe Nocera =

American journalist

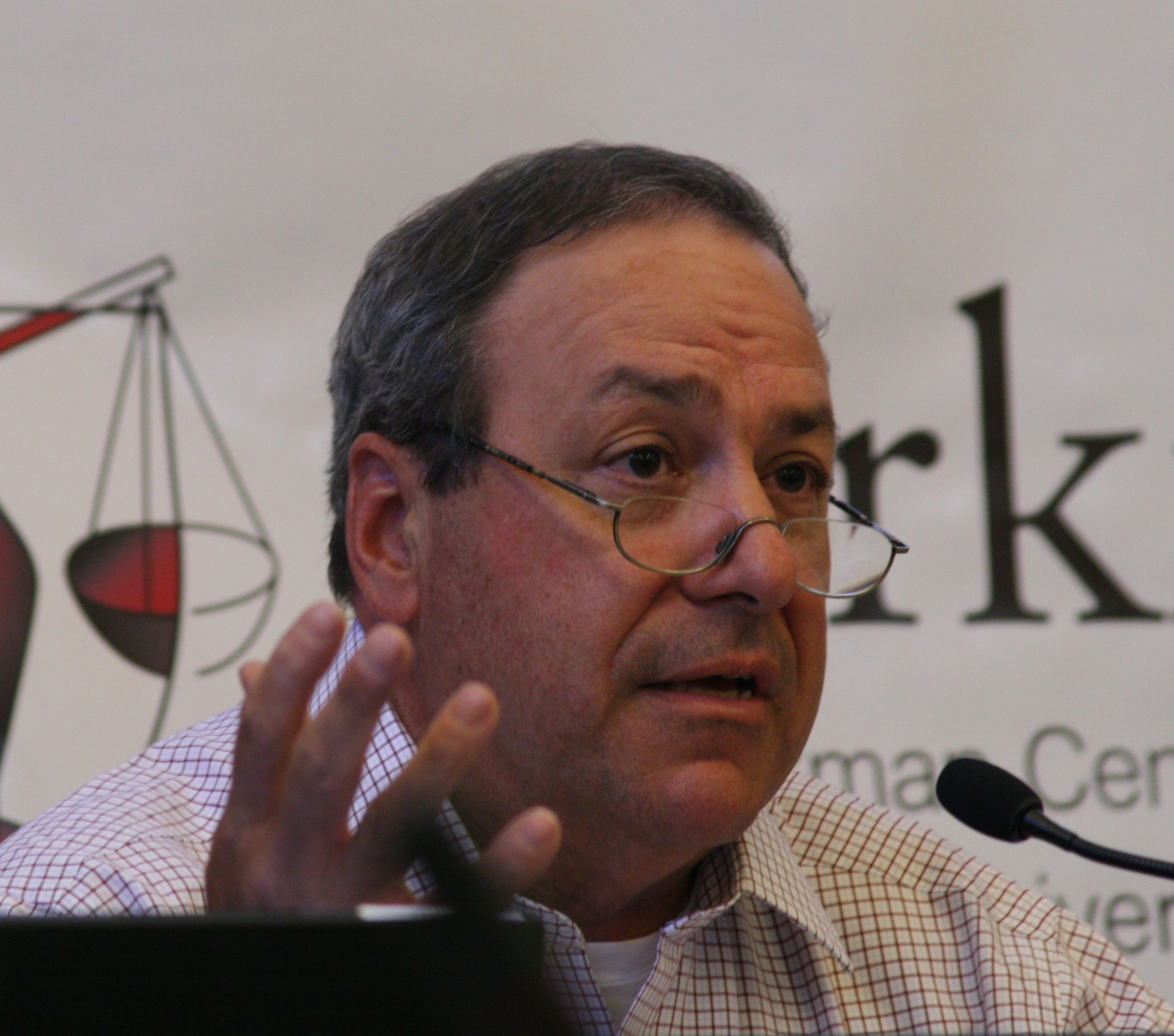
Joe Nocera at the Berkman Center for Internet & Society at Harvard University.

Joseph Nocera (born May 6, 1952) is an American business journalist and author. He has written for The New York Times since April 2005, writing for the editorial page from 2011 to 2015. He was also an opinion columnist for Bloomberg Opinion. He has co-written the books The Big Fail, A Piece of the Action and All the Devils Are Here.

== Early life and education ==
Nocera was born in Providence, Rhode Island. He earned a BS in journalism from Boston University in 1974.

== Career ==
=== Early years (1970s–2014) ===
Nocera became a business columnist for The New York Times in April 2005. In March 2011, Nocera became a regular opinion columnist for The Times's op-ed page, writing on Tuesdays and Saturdays. He was also a business commentator for NPR’s Weekend Edition with Scott Simon.

=== 2015–2024 ===
In November 2015, Nocera began writing in the sports page of The Times. Executives at The Times cited Nocera's interest in sports, specifically injuries to student athletes and business issues in college athletics, as the reason for reassignment to the sports page from the op-ed page. In his last column on the op-ed page of The Times, Nocera offered his views on several issues unrelated to sports including gun control and Michael Bloomberg's involvement with the issue, Supreme Court terms, education in the United States, e-cigarettes, and election day in the United States.

In January 2017, Nocera began writing a column for Bloomberg View on business, political and other subjects.

Nocera wrote and hosted a podcast entitled The Shrink Next Door between 2019 and 2021. A case study on the abuse by a psychotherapist towards a patient, the podcast was based on Nocera's neighbors in the Hamptons after he moved there in 2010. After the podcast, Wondery shopped the rights and sold them to MRC Studios, who created a show for Apple TV+ starring Will Ferrell. Nocera served as co-executive producer on the miniseries, which was also titled The Shrink Next Door. In late 2021, it was reported that he was suing Bloomberg over the show. Nocera alleged that Bloomberg withheld a percentage of the show's profits after they'd fired him.

In 2021, Blanchard House had set up a partnership with Nocera for Nocera to host some of the shows it had in development. In 2023, he was publishing articles in The Atlantic and Vanity Fair. In 2024, he was again an op-ed writer for The New York Times. In 2024, he published The Big Fail, a book focused on the response of the US government to the COVID pandemic. It was co-written with Bethany MacLean, as were his previous books A Piece of the Action and All the Devils Are Here.

== Areas of journalistic interest ==
Nocera's columns in the New York Times offer perspectives on a wide array of current events.

=== Criticism of the NCAA ===
Since 2011, Nocera has written over ten columns on the role played by the NCAA in the United States with a view that the NCAA "unfairly exploits college football and men's basketball players" through a "double standard." To support this view, he cites the negative effects NCAA policies may have on student athletes, which include unfair suspensions and financial inducements given to universities that lead to potential conflicts of interest.

Nocera has criticized specific actions and policies, pertaining to intercollegiate athletics, of many universities, including Rutgers University, University of North Carolina at Chapel Hill, University of Alabama, Baylor University, and University of Notre Dame. He has also extensively criticized the NCAA and Penn State University for their handling of the Penn State child sex abuse scandal.

=== Support for fracking and Keystone XL ===
Nocera advocates fracking, which is an economical method for natural gas extraction. that faces widespread debate for its environmental impact. Its critics argue that, by augmenting fossil fuel supply, fracking contributes to greenhouse gas emissions and global warming. Nocera believes that these concerns are overstated because fossil fuel consumption is driven primarily by demand. Nocera argues that, because fracking has been widely adopted, "the responsible approach is not to wish it away, but to exploit its benefits while straightforwardly addressing its problems".

Nocera also supports the construction of Keystone XL, which would transport fossil fuels from oil sands and shale gas deposits in Canada. For reasons similar to those for fracking, the proposed pipeline has been subject of political debate since it was proposed in 2008. He has been a "longtime supporter of the pipeline" as it would, in his view, help the United States achieve "energy independence".

=== Republican Party ===
In an August 2011 column on the US debt ceiling crisis, Nocera compared Tea Party Republicans with terrorists, and wrote that they "have waged jihad on the American people" and suggested that they "can put aside their suicide vests". This choice of words was criticized in a number of media outlets, including by Jonah Goldberg of the National Review, Jennifer Rubin of The Washington Post, and Peter Suderman of Reason magazine, along with then White House press secretary Jay Carney. In a follow-up column, Nocera writes "[what] most surprised me is how darned liberal I sound sometimes." He then apologized:

The words I chose were intemperate and offensive to many, and I've been roundly criticized. I was a hypocrite, the critics said, for using such language when on other occasions I've called for a more civil politics. In the cool light of day, I agree with them. I apologize.

After comparing congressional negotiations with "hand-to-hand combat," Nocera concluded the column with "I won't be calling anybody names. That I can promise."

== Recognition ==
Nocera earned three John Hancock Awards for Excellence in Business Writing in 1983, 1984, and 1991, respectively. Nocera's book A Piece of the Action: How the Middle Class Joined the Money Class won the New York Public Library's Helen Bernstein Award for best non-fiction book of 1995. His contributions to business journalism have been recognized with three Gerald Loeb Awards: 1983 in the Magazines category for "It's Time to Make a Deal", 1996 in the Magazines category for "Fatal Litigation", and 2008 in the Commentary category for "Talking Business". In 2007, he was named a Pulitzer Prize for Commentary finalist. Indentured: The Inside Story of the Rebellion Against the NCAA, which he co-wrote with Ben Strauss, won the 2017 PEN America ESPN Award for Literary Sportswriting.

== Personal life ==
Nocera lives in New York City.

== Bibliography ==
- Nocera, Joseph (1994). A Piece of The Action How The Middle Class Joined The Money Class. New York: Simon & Schuster. ISBN 978-0684804354.
- Nocera, Joseph (2008). Good Guys and Bad Guys: Behind the Scenes with the Saints and Scoundrels of American Business (and Everything in Between). Portfolio. ISBN 978-1591841623.
- Nocera, Joseph; McLean, Bethany (2010). All the Devils Are Here: The Hidden History of the Financial Crisis. New York: Portfolio. ISBN 978-1591843634.
- Nocera, Joseph; Strauss, Ben (2016). Indentured: The Inside Story of the Rebellion Against the NCAA. Portfolio.
- Nocera, Joseph; McLean, Bethany (2023). The Big Fail: What the Pandemic Revealed About Who America Protects and Who It Leaves Behind. Portfolio. ISBN 978-0593331026.

Nocera's Op-Ed columns at the New York Times are available at Nocera – Op-Ed Columns.

== See also ==
- New Yorkers in journalism
