= All the Devils Are Here =

2010 book by Bethany McLean and Joseph Nocera

- Author: Bethany McLean and Joseph Nocera
- Language: English
- Subject: Economic History, Finance
- Publisher: Portfolio/Penguin Press
- Publication date: November 16, 2010
- Publication place: United States
- Media type: Hardcover
- Pages: 400 pp.
- ISBN: 1-59184-363-4
- OCLC: 535490487

All the Devils Are Here: The Hidden History of the Financial Crisis is a nonfiction book by authors Bethany McLean and Joe Nocera about the 2008 financial crisis. It details how the 2008 financial crisis spawned from a volatile, and bipartisan, mixture of government meddling and laissez-faire. It concludes that the episode was not an accident, and that banks understood the big picture before the crisis happened but continued with bad practices nevertheless.

== The title ==
The title of the book comes from William Shakespeare's play The Tempest, in which he wrote "Hell is empty, and all the devils are here".

== Notable people in the book ==
- Angelo Mozilo
- Roland Arnall
- Maurice R. Greenberg
- Stan O'Neal
- Lloyd Blankfein
- Franklin Raines
- Brian Clarkson
- Alan Greenspan

== Reviews ==
- Seeking Alpha
- Seattle PI
- Business Pundit
- Business Week
- New York Times
- INC.com
- Huffington Post
- Washington Post
- Forbes
