= Bethany McLean =

American journalist (born 1970)

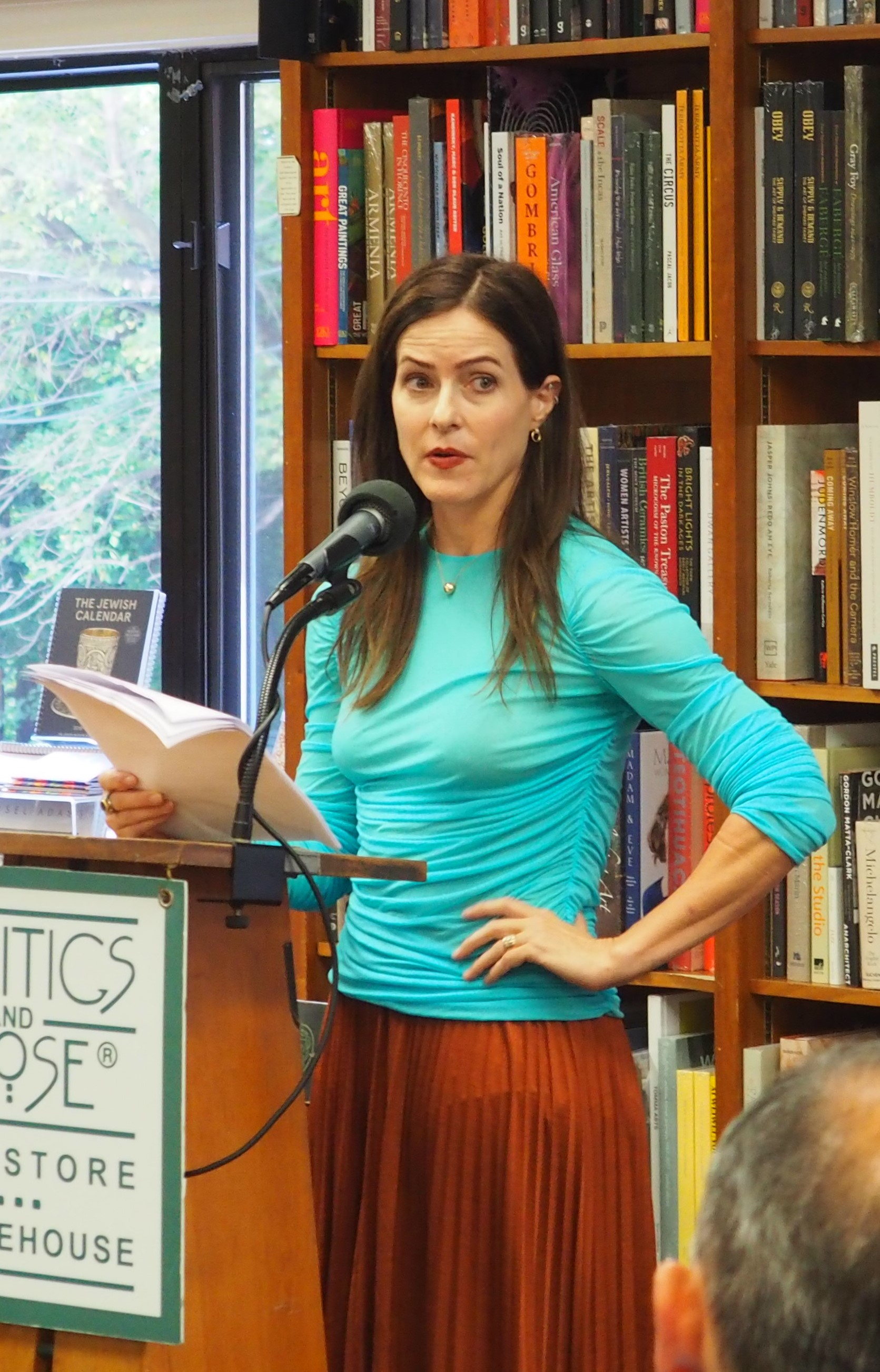
- McLean in 2018
- Born: December 12, 1970 (age 55); Hibbing, Minnesota, U.S.
- Education: Williams College
- Occupation: Journalist
- Notable work: "Is Enron Overpriced?"; The Smartest Guys in the Room; All the Devils Are Here
- Spouses: Chris Wilford (m. 2000; div. 2006) Sean M. Berkowitz (m. 2008; div. 2020)
- Children: 2

Bethany Lee McLean (born December 12, 1970) is an American journalist and contributing editor for Vanity Fair magazine. She is known for her writing on the Enron scandal and the 2008 financial crisis. Previous assignments include editor-at-large, columnist for Fortune, and a contributor to Slate.

== Early life and education ==
McLean was born in Hibbing, Minnesota on December 12, 1970. McLean graduated from Hibbing High School in 1988. In 1992 she received a B.A. in English and mathematics from Williams College.

== Career ==
McLean started her career as an investment banking analyst for Goldman Sachs and joined Vanity Fair as a contributing editor in 2008. She began as a contributor to Slate's Moneybox column, in 2010 and "The Bulldog" column in Fortune.

She authored an article on Enron for the March 5, 2001, issue of Fortune entitled, "Is Enron Overpriced?" The article noted some irregularities in Enron's financial documents that were available to the public, suggesting the company's then-record high stock price was unjustified but she did not at that point suspect fraud at Enron. After Enron's rapid collapse later in 2001, McLean co-authored, with Peter Elkind, the book The Smartest Guys in the Room (2003) which detailed the corrupt business practices of Enron officials. The book was later made into the Academy Award-nominated documentary Enron: The Smartest Guys in the Room.

In 2005, McLean got into a spat with then-CEO of Overstock.com Patrick M. Byrne after she wrote a negative article about Overstock and him.

She co-authored with Joe Nocera a book on the 2008 financial crisis titled All the Devils Are Here.

In September 2015, she published Shaky Ground: The Strange Saga of the U.S. Mortgage Giants which examines the governance and financial situation of Fannie Mae and Freddie Mac seven years after the 2008 financial crisis. The Washington Post selected it as one of the best nonfiction books of 2015.

In September 2018, she published Saudi America: The Truth about Fracking and How It's Changing the World which examined the "fracking revolution" and U.S. energy independence. In 2019, Mclean launched a podcast titled Making a Killing on Luminary. She also joined the Capitalisn't podcast as a co-host in season 2, along with Chicago Booth Professor Luigi Zingales. She is also an advisor for Hunterbrook Media.

== Personal life ==
McLean married Chris Wilford in 2000 and divorced in 2006. In May 2008, she married attorney Sean Berkowitz, the former Director of the United States Department of Justice Enron Task Force. They divorced in 2020. McLean resides in Chicago with her children.

== Bibliography ==
=== Books ===
- McLean, Bethany; Elkind, Peter (2003). The Smartest Guys in the Room: The Amazing Rise and Scandalous Fall of Enron. New York: Portfolio. ISBN 1-59184-008-2. OCLC 52418094.
- McLean, Bethany; Nocera, Joe (2011). All the Devils Are Here: The Hidden History of the Financial Crisis. New York: Portfolio/Penguin. ISBN 978-1-101-44079-7. OCLC 688505799.
- McLean, Bethany (2015). Shaky Ground: The Strange Saga of the U.S. Mortgage Giants. New York: Columbia Global Reports. ISBN 978-0-9909763-0-1. OCLC 898533197.
- McLean, Bethany (2018). Saudi America: The Truth About Fracking and How It's Changing the World. New York: Columbia Global Reports. ISBN 978-0-9997454-4-1. OCLC 1028187397.
- McLean, Bethany; Nocera, Joe (2023). The Big Fail: What the Pandemic Revealed About Who America Protects and Who It Leaves Behind. New York: Portfolio. ISBN 978-0-5933310-2-6. OCLC 1365362764.

=== Essays and reporting ===
- McLean, Bethany (March 5, 2001). "Is Enron Overpriced?". Fortune (magazine).
- Burrough, Bryan & McLean, Bethany (May 2, 2013). "The hunt for Steve Cohen". Vanity Fair. Vol. 634. pp. 76–83, 121–125.
- McLean, Bethany (August 25, 2019). ""He's Full of Shit": How Elon Musk Gambled Tesla to Save SolarCity". Vanity Fair.
